= IFarm =

Agricultural technology company

iFarm
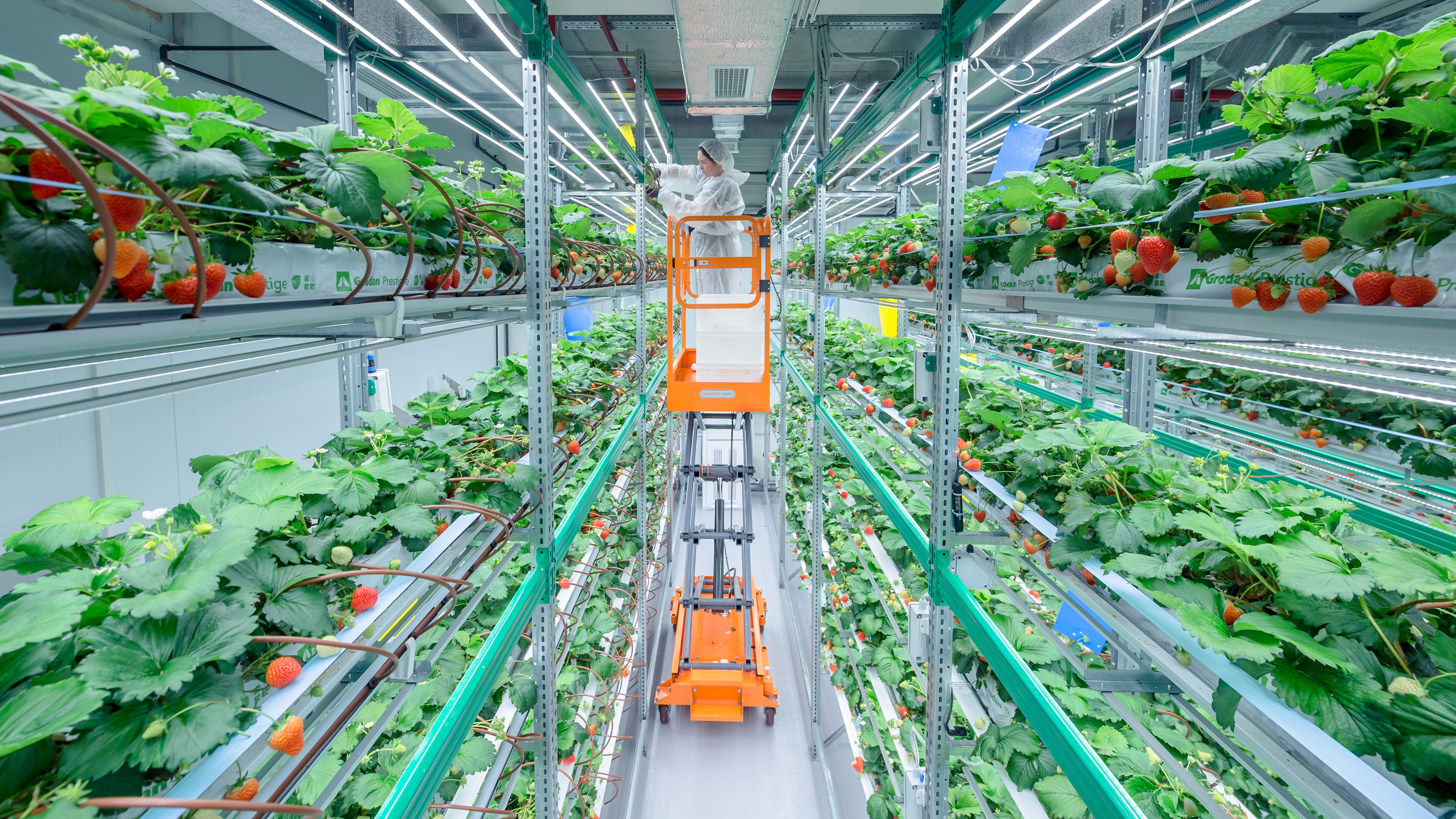
- iFarm interior
- Industry: Vertical farming, hydroponics, circular economy, agricultural technology
- Founded: 2017
- Headquarters: Helsinki, Finland
- Key people: Alexander Lyskovsky, Maxim Chizhov, Konstantin Ulyanov
- Products: Software, technologies and equipment for vertical farming
- Website: ifarm.fi

iFarm (iFarm corp.) is an international company that develops software and hardware for vertical farming and hydroponics. Its technologies are used for automatedd pesticide-free growing of salads, strawberries, and microgreens. It's headquartered in Helsinki, Finland with an office in the US.

== History ==
It was founded in 2017 by Alex Lyskovsky, the founder of video game publisher Alawar, and his friends.

In 2018, the company expanded its facilities with a large-scale salad farm and a laboratory for strawberry production.

In 2019, iFarm raised $1 million in a round led by Gagarin Capital. The same year, the company moved its headquarters to Helsinki, Finland. It opened 8 laboratories and launched a small point-of-sale herb cultivation module production.

In 2020, the company opened an office in the Netherlands. In July 2020, company became a member of the international Association for Vertical Farming. In August 2020, the company announced the raise of $4 million in seed funding from a group of investors. In the same year, iFarm partnered with YASAI AG and Logiqs B.V. to launch Zurich's first vertical farm.

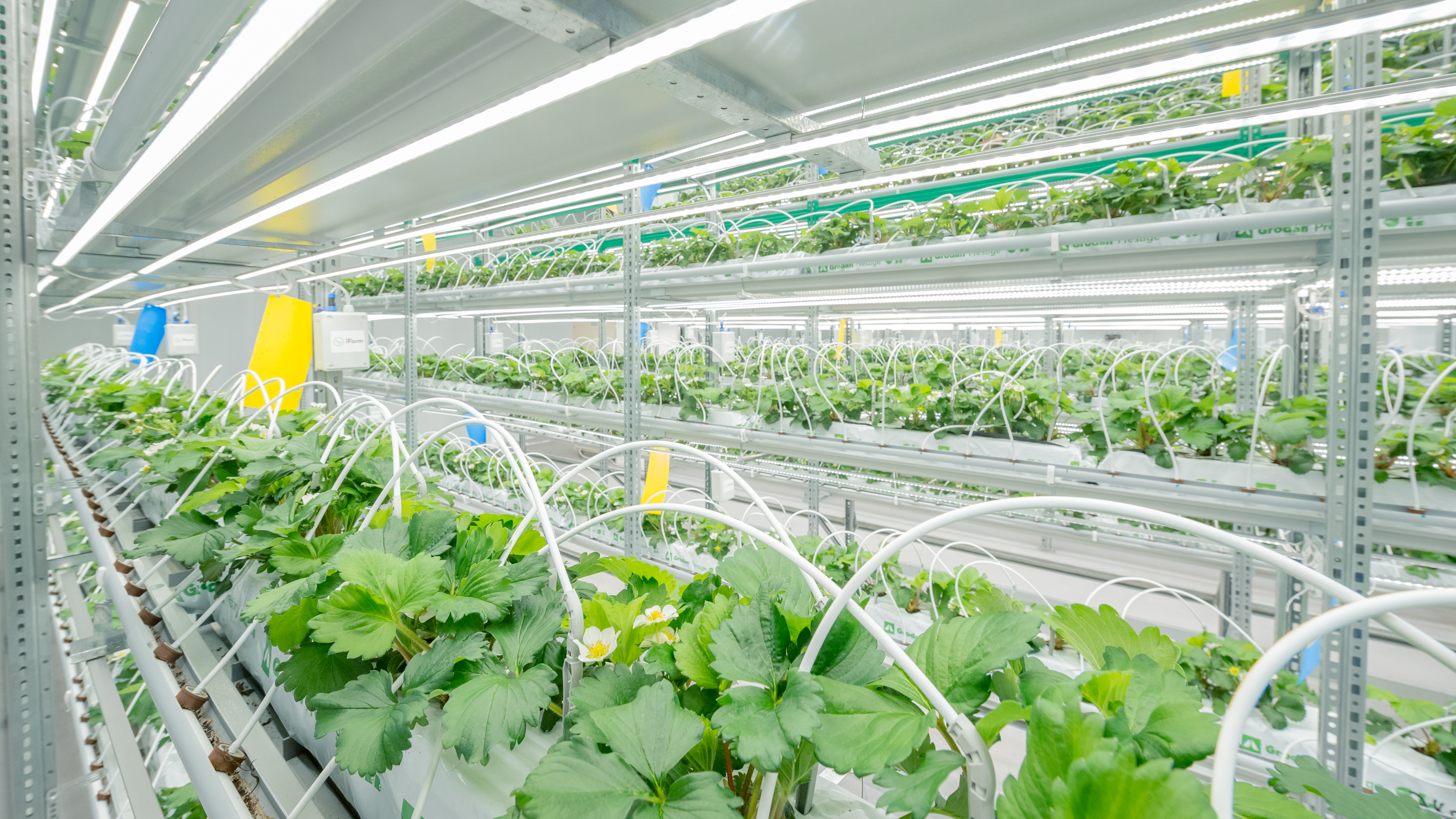
iFarm inside

In 2021, a partnership with the AlSadarah Group was announced to use iFarm technology in a pilot vertical farm in Al Khor, Qatar.

In January 2022, iFarm and French scientific cosmetics company Capsum launched a sustainable vertical farming research project to create innovative cosmetics in France.

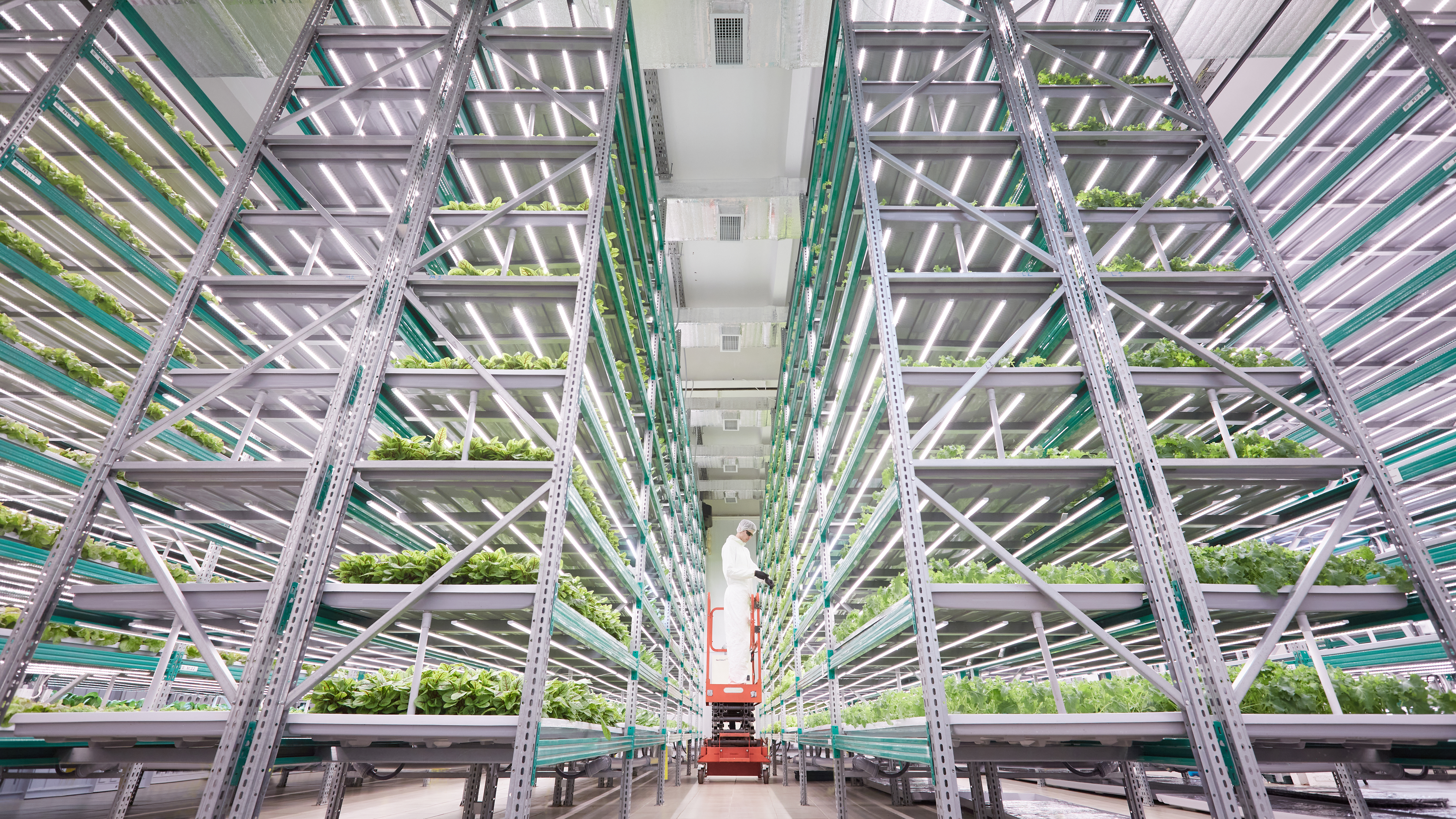
IFarm elevator

As of 2022, the company helped clients create farms based on iFarm technology in 14 countries, including Norway, Switzerland, Germany, Andorra, Finland, Qatar, Saudi Arabia and the UAE.

== Technology ==
iFarm technology relies on automation, sensors and a proprietary farm management software, Growtune, to monitor and automate crop care, applying computer vision and machine learning and drawing on data on "thousands" of plants collected from a distributed network of farms, per iFarm.

In 2022, firm released fully automated solution, that reduces the overall energy bill compared to traditional type of vertical farms due to a system that automatically "transplants" (refits) the grow space for the plants.
