= Urban horticulture =

Science of growing plants in urban environments

Urban horticulture is the science and study of the growing plants in an urban environment. It focuses on the functional use of horticulture so as to maintain and improve the surrounding urban area. Urban horticulture has seen an increase in attention with the global trend of urbanization and works to study the harvest, aesthetic, architectural, recreational and psychological purposes and effects of plants in urban environments.

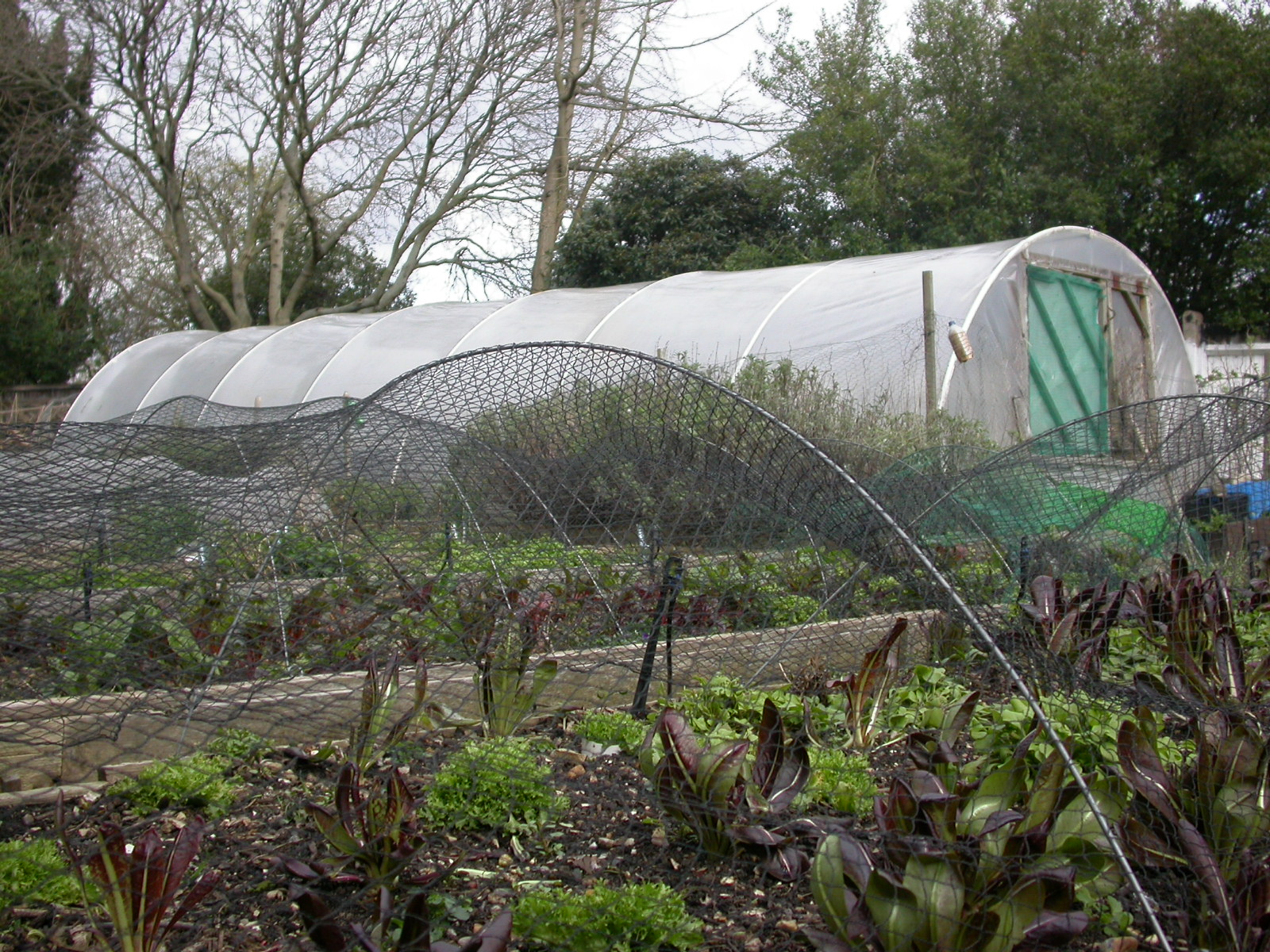
Salad lettuce cultivation at the Growing Communities' urban plot, in Springfield Park, Clapton, North London

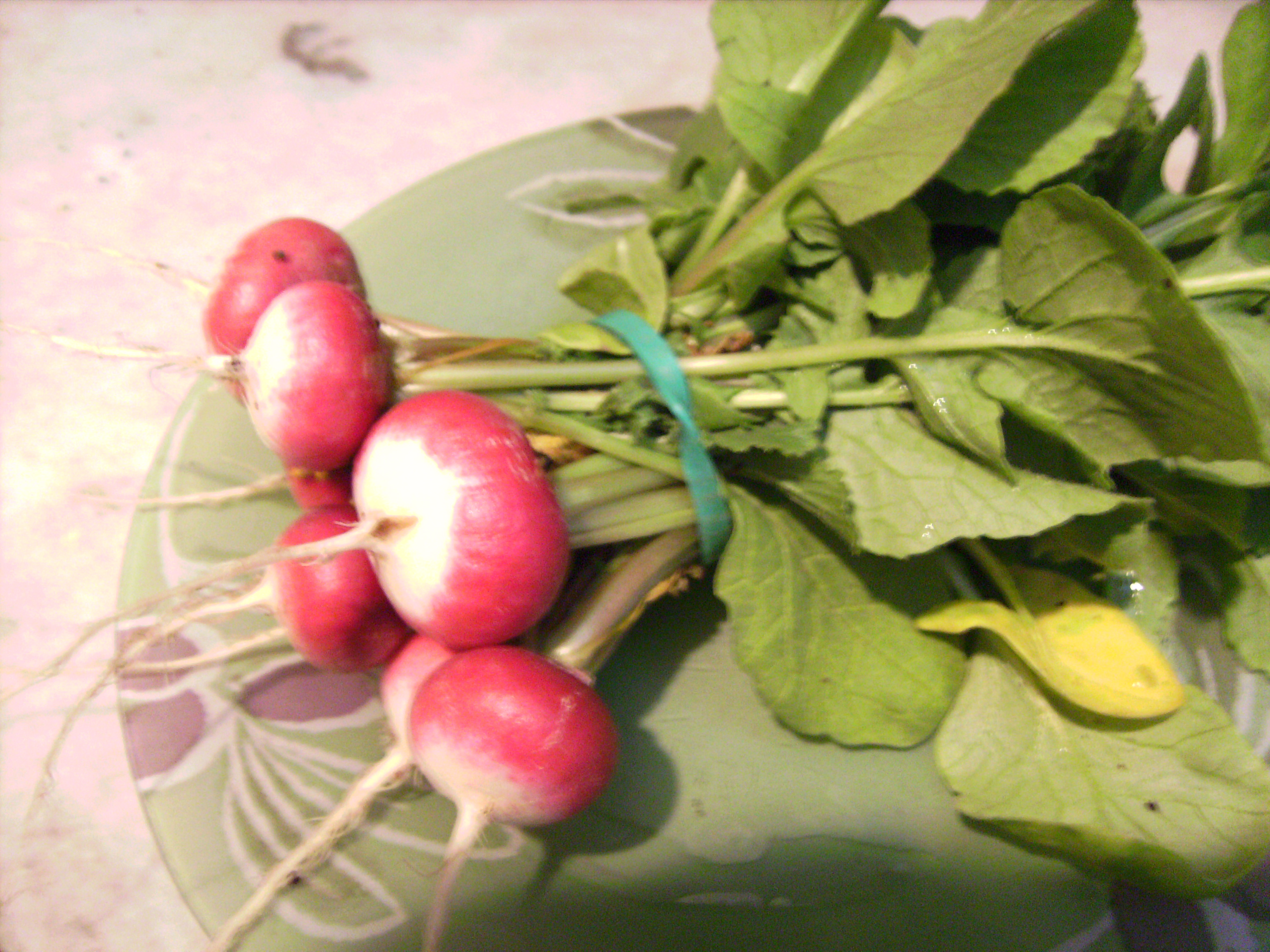
Small radish grown on a balcony in Barcelona city

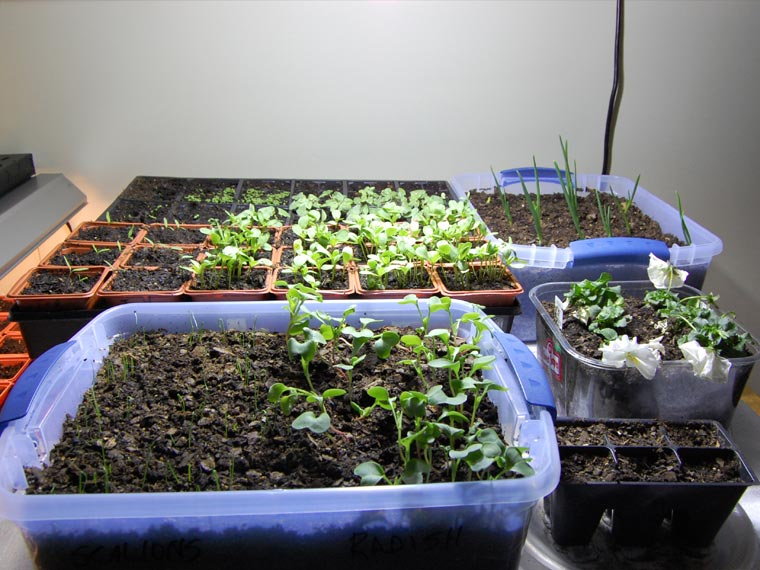
A variety of flowers and vegetables grown under metal halide lamps

== History ==
Horticulture and the integration of nature into human civilization has been a major part in the establishment of cities. During the Neolithic Revolution cities would often be built with market gardens and farms as their trading centers. Studies in urban horticulture rapidly increased with the major growth of cities during the Industrial Revolution. These insights led to the field being dispersed to farmers in the hinterlands. For centuries, the built environment such as homes, public buildings, etc. were integrated with cultivation in the form of gardens, farms, grazing lands, etc. Therefore, horticulture was a regular part of everyday life in the city. With the Industrial Revolution and the related increasing populations rapidly changed the landscape and replaced green spaces with brick and asphalt. After the nineteenth century, Horticulture was then selectively restored in some urban spaces as a response to the unhealthy conditions of factory neighborhoods and cities began seeing the development of parks.

=== Post World War II trends ===
Early urban horticulture movements majorly served the purposes of short term welfare during recession periods, philanthropic charity to uplift "the masses" or patriotic relief. The tradition of urban horticulture mostly declined after World War II as suburbs became the focus of residential and commercial growth. Most of the economically stable population moved out of the cities into the suburbs, leaving only slums and ghettos at the city centers. However, there were a few exceptions of garden projects initiated by public housing authorities in the 1950s and 1960s for the purpose of beautification and tenant pride. But for the most part as businesses also left the metropolitan areas, it generated wastelands and areas of segregated poverty.

Inevitably the disinvestment of major city centers, specifically in America, resulted in the drastic increase of vacant lots. Existing buildings became uninhabitable, houses were abandoned and even productive industrial land became vacant. Modern community gardening, urban agriculture, and food security movements were a form of response to battle the above problems at a local level. In fact other movements at that time such as the peace, environmental, women's, civil rights, and "back-to-the-city" movements of the 1960s and 1970s and the environmental justice movement of the 1980s and 1990s saw opportunity in these vacant lands as a way of reviving communities through school and community gardens, farmers' markets, and urban agriculture.

=== Modern community garden movement ===
Things have taken a turn in the twenty-first century as people are recognizing the need for local community gardens and green spaces. It is not the concept but the purposes that are new. The main goals of this movement include cleaning up neighborhoods, pushing out drug dealing that occurs at empty lots, growing and preserving food for consumption, restoring nature to industrial areas, and bringing the farming traditions to urban cities. Essentially community gardening is seen as way of creating a relationship between people and a place through social and physical engagement. Most urban gardens are created on vacant land that vary in size and are generally gardened as individual plots by community members. Such areas can support social, cultural, and artistic events and contribute to the rebuilding of local community spirit. The modern community garden movement is initiated by neighborhoods along with the support of the governments and non-profit organizations. Some gardens are linked to public housing projects, schools through garden-based learning programs, churches and social agencies and some even employ those who are incarcerated. Community gardens which are now a large part of the urban horticulture movement are different from the earlier periods of grand park development in that the latter only served to free the people from the industrialism. In addition a community garden is more beneficial and engaging than a mere lawn or park and serves as a valuable access to nature where wilderness is unavailable. This movement helped create and sustain relationships between city dwellers and the soil and contributed to a different kind of urban environmentalism that did not have any characteristics of reform charity.

Despite that it has been 30 years since the first community gardens in the US, there is no concrete analysis of current urban gardens and their organizations. The American Community Gardening Association (ACGA) has estimations that show that municipal governments and non-profit organizations operate gardening programs in about 250 cities and towns, although the staff of this organization admits that this number could in reality be twice as large. In 1994 survey, the National Gardening Association found that 6.7 million households that weren't involved in gardening would be interested in doing so if there was a plot nearby. A more recent survey showed that more gardens are being created in cities as opposed to being lost to economic development.

Today urban horticulture has several components that include more than just community gardens, such as market gardens, small farms and farmers' markets and is an important aspect of community development. Another result of urban horticulture is the food security movement where locally grown food is given precedence through several projects and programs, thus providing low-cost and nutritious food. Urban community gardens and the food security movement was a response to the problems of industrial agriculture and to solve its related problems of price inflation, lack of supermarkets, food scarcity, etc.

== Benefits ==
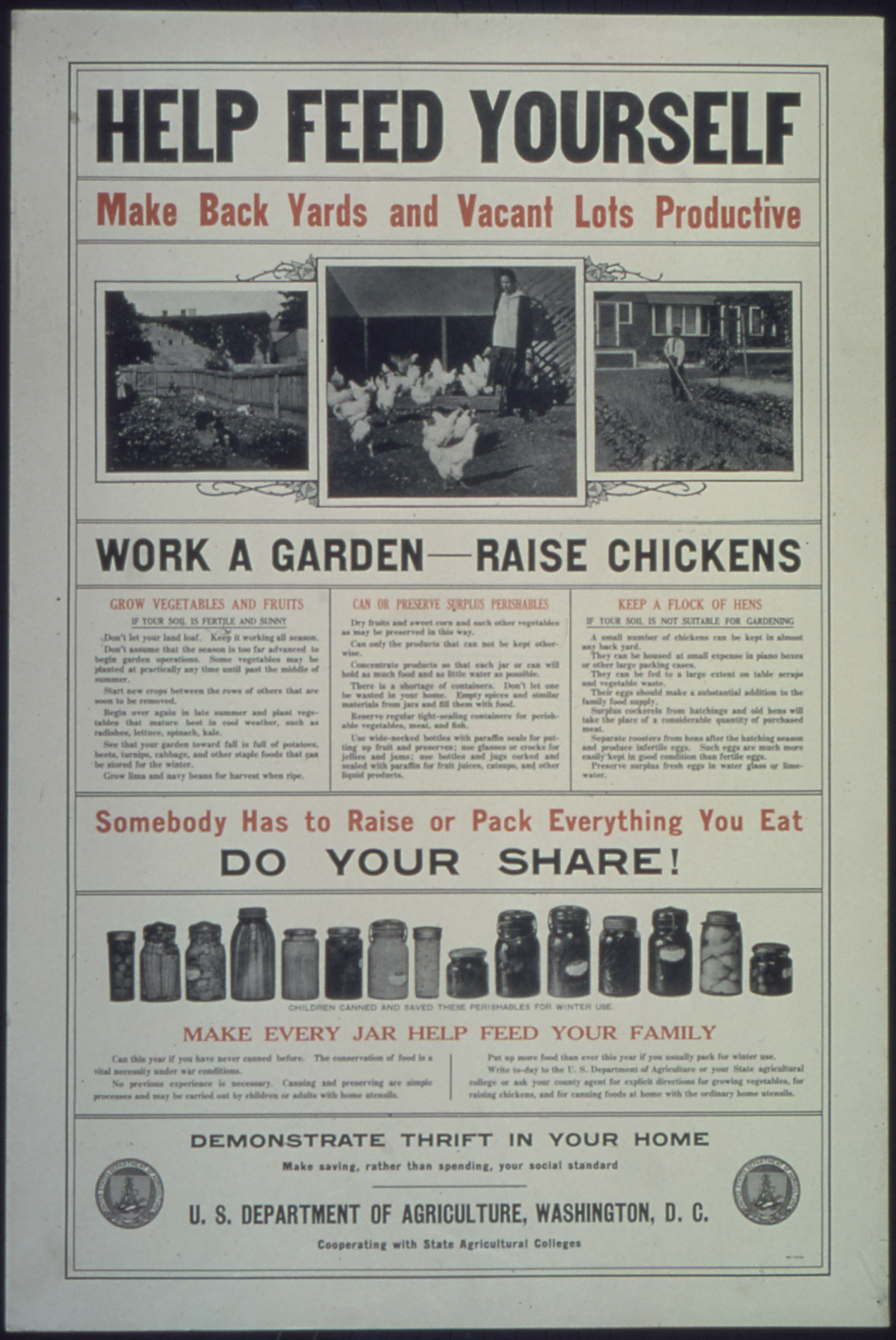
World War I poster of the U.S. Department of Agriculture, encouraging the use of vacant urban areas for gardening

Horticulture by itself is a practical and applied science, which means it can have a significance in our everyday lives. As community gardens cannot actually compete with market-based land uses, it is essential to find other ways to understand their various benefits such as their contribution to social, human, and financial well-being. Frederick Law Olmsted, the designer of New York City's Central Park observed that the trees, meadows, ponds and wildlife tranquilize the stresses of city life. According to various studies over the years, nature has a very positive impact over human health and even more so in an emotional and psychological sense. Trees, grass, and flower gardens, due to their presence as well as visibility, increase people's life satisfaction by reducing fatigue and irritation and restoring a sense of calm. In fact Honeyman tested the restorative value of nature scenes in urban settings and discovered that vegetation in an urban setting produced more mental restoration as opposed to areas without vegetation. In addition, areas with only nature did not have as much of a positive psychological impact as did the combination of urban areas and nature.

One of the obvious health benefits of gardening is the increased intake of fruits and vegetables, but the act of gardening itself provides an additional major health benefit. Gardening is a low-impact exercise, which when added into daily activities, can help reduce weight, lower stress, and improve overall health. A recent study showed a reduced body mass index and lower weight in community gardeners compared with their non-gardening counterparts. The study showed men who gardened had a body mass index 2.36 lower and were 62% less likely to be overweight than their neighbors, while women were 46% less likely to be overweight with a body mass index 1.88 lower than their neighbors. Access to urban gardens can improve health through nutritious, edible plantings, as well by getting people outside and promoting more activity in their environments.

Gardening programs in inner-city schools have become increasingly popular as a way to teach children not only about healthy eating habits, but also to encourage students to become active learners. Besides getting students outside and moving, and encouraging an active lifestyle, children also learn leadership, teamwork, communication and collaboration skills, in addition to critical and creative thinking skills. Gardening in schools will enable children to share with their families the health and nutrition benefits of eating fresh fruits and vegetables. Because weather and soil conditions are in a state of constant change, students learn to adapt their thinking and creatively problem solve, depending on the situations that arise. Students also learn to interact and communicate with a diverse population of people, from other students to adult volunteers. These programs benefit students' health and enable them to be active contributors in the world around them.

Gardens and other green spaces also increase social activity and help in creating a sense of place, apart from their various other purposes such as enhancing the community by mediating environmental factors. There is also a huge disparity in the availability of sources that provide nutritious and affordable foods especially around urban centers which have problems of poverty, lack of public transport and abandonment by supermarkets. Therefore, inner city community gardens can be a valuable source of nutrition at an affordable cost in the most easily accessible way.

In order to understand and thereby maximize the benefits of urban horticulture, it is essential to document the effects of horticulture activities and quantify the benefits so that governments and private industries can make the appropriate changes. Horticulturists have always been involved in the botanical and physical aspects of horticulture but an involvement in its social and emotional factors would be highly beneficial to communities, cities and to the field of horticulture and its profession. Based on this, in the 1970s, the International Society for Horticultural Science recognized this need for research on the functional use of plants in an urban setting along with the need of improved communication between scientists in this field of research and people who utilize plants. The Commission for Urban Horticulture was established in 1982 which deals with plants grown in urban areas, management techniques, the functional use of these plants as well the shortcomings of the current lack of knowledge regarding this field. The establishment of such a commission is an important indicator that this topic has reached a level of international recognition.

=== Economic benefits ===
There are many different economic benefits from gardening from saving money purchasing food and even on the utility bills. Developing countries can spend up to 60–80 percent of income on buying food alone. In Barbara Lake, Milfront Taciano and Gavin Michaels Journal of Psychology article "The Relative Influence of Psycho-Social Factors on Urban Gardening", they say that while people are saving money on buying food, having roof top gardens are also becoming popular. Having green roofs can reduce the cost of heating in the winter and help stay cool in the summer. Green roofs also can lower the cost of roof replacement. While green roofs are an addition to urban horticulture people are eating healthy while also improving the value of their property. Other benefits include increased employment from non-commercial jobs where producers include reductions on the cost of food.

== Production practices ==
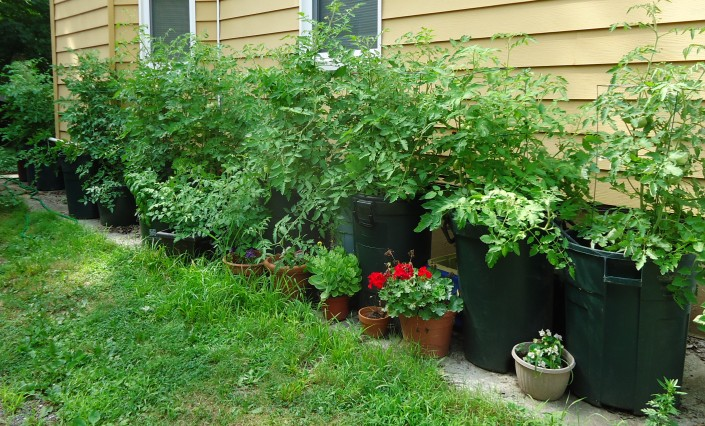
Tomato plants growing in a pot farming alongside a small house in New Jersey in fifteen garbage cans filled with soil grew over 700 tomatoes during the summer of 2013.

Crops are grown in flowerpots, growbags, small gardens or larger fields, using traditional or high-tech and innovative practices. Some new techniques that have been adapted to the urban situation and tackle the main city restrictions are also documented. These include horticultural production on built-up land using various types of substrates (e.g. roof top, organic production and hydroponic/aeroponic production). The adaptation of vertical farming methods like the use of trellises or tomato cages are popular options for urban horticulture. Because of this, urban horticulture often includes practices such as rooftop vegetable gardening and container-based cultivation, which allow crops to be grown in limited spaces and non-traditional environments.

== Urban horticulture around the world ==
=== Urban and peri-urban horticulture in Africa ===
A report of the United Nations Food and Agriculture Organization, Growing greener cities in Africa, states that market gardening – i.e. irrigated, commercial production of fruit and vegetables in areas designated for the purpose, or in other urban open spaces – is the single most important source of locally grown, fresh produce in 10 out of 27 African countries for which data are available. Market gardening produces most of all the leafy vegetables consumed in Accra, Dakar, Bangui, Brazzaville, Ibadan, Kinshasa and Yaoundé, cities that, between them, have a total population of 22.5 million. Market gardens provide around half of the leafy vegetable supply in Addis Ababa, Bissau and Libreville. The report says that in most of urban Africa, market gardening is an informal and often illegal activity, which has grown with little official recognition, regulation or support. Most gardeners have no formal title to their land, and many lose it overnight. Land suitable for horticulture is being taken for housing, industry and infrastructure. To maximize earnings from insecure livelihoods, many gardeners are overusing pesticide and urban waste water.

=== Urban horticulture in Latin America ===
Starting in the 1980s, Latin American governments came to see urban agroecology and horticulture not only as an agricultural practice but as a revolutionary tool aimed at restructuring society along more equitable and sustainable lines. In some cases, urban horticulture fell under the larger umbrella of 'urban agriculture' and was utilized as a way for governments to push for better agricultural policies that helped citizens. In Latin America, institutional support for urban farming practices came through the social reforms of the 1960s and 1970s, where there was a significant push for sustainable and equitable agricultural practices as a response to the failures of the Green Revolution. The Green Revolution as well as globalism prompted South American governments to invest less in agriculture and incentivized higher expenditure on food imports, often due to international economic pressure. These policies hurt national food sovereignty and small-scale farmers, and further exacerbated existing socio-economic inequalities.

== See also ==
- Allotment gardens
- Aquaponics
- Flowerpot farming
- Foodscaping
- Folkewall
- Garden sharing
- Green wall
- Intercultural Garden
- Organic horticulture
- Rooftop farming
- Roof garden
- Sprouting
- Urban agriculture
- Urban forest
- Urban forestry
- Urban green space
- Vertical farming
- Victory garden
- Organopónicos
