= TTA-ISO =

General information
- Type: Private
- Industry: Horticulture automation
- Predecessors: TTA; ISO Horti
- Founded: 2025
- Headquarters: Bleskensgraaf, Netherlands
- Key people: Jan Bakker (CEO); Bram Verschoor (CCO)
- Employees: >250
- Website: tta-iso.com

Location
- Netherlands: Bleskensgraaf (HQ); Gameren; De Goorn
- Americas: TTA-ISO Americas
- Oceania: TTA-ISO Oceania
- Area served: Worldwide

Products and services
- Semi-automatic machines Entry-level machines Automation lines Fully automatic machines

TTA-ISO is a machine manufacturing company specializing in the development and production of automation technology for the horticultural sector.

TTA-ISO operates worldwide under TTA-ISO Americas (North and South America) and TTA-ISO Oceania (Australia).

Their products facilitate Ornamentals, Bulbs and Cut Flowers, Food production (CEA), and Carbon and Forestry.

== History ==
The company was formed in 2025 after the merger of TTA and ISO Horti.

TTA (1996) specialized in automation solutions for transplanting and sorting processes, whilst ISO Horti (2002) specialized in vision technology and industrial technology to automate processes such as cutting and planting.

Since January 20, 2025, the two companies have operated together as TTA-ISO. The company (TTA-ISO) develops and designs automation machinery equipped with AI systems and vision technology. The equipment automates common horticulture processes that require manual handling by human operators.

In 2026, TTA-ISO became a member of the Club of 100, a research and innovation collaboration in greenhouse horticulture managed by Wageningen University & Research.

In October 2026, TTA-ISO acquired Demtec after the bankruptcy of the Belgian company 'Constructie Werkhuizen Demaitere BV' in August 2026. Demtec develops and builds machines for potting, tray filling, seeding, and intern transport. After the acquisition, Demtec remained operative as its own brand under TTA-ISO, as ‘Dementec, a TTA-ISO brand’.

== Automation in horticulture ==
Traditionally, horticultural operations, such as grafting, planting and harvesting, rely on manual labor. The introduction of automated machinery and robotic systems aims to increase production efficiency, improve consistency and reduce dependence on manual labor.

Machine vision is a component of horticultural automation. Camera-based systems can identify plants, assess their position and orientation, and provide information that enables robotic equipment to perform operations with greater precision. These technologies are being investigated and applied in various horticultural processes, including plant handling and harvesting.

Artificial intelligence (AI) is also used in horticultural automation. AI-based systems can analyze visual information, recognize patterns and support automated decision-making.

Horticultural automation presents several technical challenges. Biological variation between plants, changing environmental conditions and the nature of horticultural products require machinery capable of adapting to different circumstances. The development of automated systems therefore involves the integration of mechanical engineering, robotics, computer vision and plant science.

TTA-ISO has contributed to horticultural automation by introducing specialized machinery for different processes. The company initially focused solely on automation solutions for chrysanthemum growing. Currently, TTA-ISO’s area of focus includes: Ornamentals, Bulbs and Cut Flowers, Food production (CEA), and Carbon and Forestry.

Ornamentals

Ornamental horticulture is the cultivation of plants grown for decorative purposes, for example in gardens, interiors and landscaping. Many ornamental crops are propagated from cuttings.

For ornamentals, TTA-ISO developed equipment for sorting, transplanting plugs and cuttings, and germination correction.

Bulbs and Cut flowers

Floriculture is the cultivation of flowering and ornamental plants for gardens and floristry. Cut flowers are harvested with part of the stem, and many, such as tulips, are grown from bulbs.

TTA-ISO has developed and built transplanters for plugs and cuttings, sorters, and harvesting machines for Bulbs and Cut flowers nurseries.

CEA

Controlled-environment agriculture (CEA) encompasses crop production systems in indoor environments using engineering that surpasses soil-based outdoor production. These systems may increase yields, improve access to local foods, provide year-round food access and improve nutritional outcomes relative to traditional large scale farming.

For CEA facilities, TTA-ISO has developed and built transplanters and harvesting machines.

Carbon and Forestry

Forestry is the practice of creating, managing, planting and conserving forests, and forestry nurseries raise young trees in plug trays for planting out.

TTA-ISO has developed packing, sorting, transplanting and pot & tray handling equipment for forestry nurseries
