= Eden Green Technology =

American agricultural corporation

- Company type: Private
- Founded: 2017
- Headquarters: Cleburne, TX
- Key people: CEO: Eddy Badrina

Eden Green Technology is an agricultural technology company headquartered in the city of Cleburne, TX. The company develops and manufactures hydroponic vertical growing systems for commercial food crops and research and development greenhouses. In 2021, the company recently received a $12 million investment which will help open up a new facility.

== Early history ==
Eden Green Technology’s operations were established south of Dallas in 2017 by brothers Jacques and Eugene van Buuren as a means toward feeding the hungry in underserved areas such as those in their native country of South Africa. The idea was creating growing systems for fresh, sustainable, and scalable food sources for people around the world using modular vertical greenhouse technology. Current CEO, Eddy Badrina was introduced in 2019 and has helped stabilize the company, as well as shifting the company's focus towards marketing their technology to growers.

== Technology ==
The vertical microclimate hydroponic system eliminates waste, energy, and reduces land usage. The technology utilizes the Nutrient Film Technique, in which nutrients are dissolved in the bare roots of the growing plants. The company currently holds one US patent for hydroponic growing systems, 15/564885, one patent pending, 16/503209, as well as Australian patent #2016246179 and Japanese patent #2018-513695. These patents pertain to hydroponics inventions that are used in the company’s vertical farming systems. Walmart and Eden Green have formed a partnership to help meet the produce needs within regional distribution systems.

The vertical greenhouses can be used for commercial purposes for restaurants and grocery stores, for non-profit organizations or local government aimed at providing healthy food to underserved populations living in food deserts, or for research and development purposes. Eden Green claim the produce created using their technology is cleaner and safer for both the planet and people's consumption.

== Charity Work ==
In 2020, Eden Green Technology partnered with the Cal Ripken Sr. Foundation, Harvest Project, SpringSpirit, Oak Cliff Veggie Project, Our Calling, Hunger Busters, and several other nonprofit partners to provide fresh greens and other produce to the DFW and Houston markets.
