= Horticultural building system =

Horticultural Building Systems are defined as the instance where vegetation and an architectural/architectonic system exist in a mutually defined and intentionally designed relationship that supports plant growth and an architectonic concept. The most common form of these systems in contemporary vernacular is green wall, vertical garden, green roof, roof garden, building-integrated agriculture (BIA), yet the history of these systems may be traced back through greenhouse technology, hydroponicums, horticultural growth chambers, and beyond. These horticultural building systems evolved form a reciprocal relationship between plant cultural requirements and architectural technology.
