= AVF =

AVF may refer to:

- Afrikaner Volksfront, a South African separatist organization
- Auckland volcanic field, a volcanic field in New Zealand
- Australian Volleyball Federation
- Arteriovenous fistula, a connection between an artery and a vein
- Association for Vertical Farming
- AV Formula, a Spanish racing team created by Adrián Vallés

aVF may refer to:

- The augmented vector foot (aVF) lead, a voltage difference in electrocardiography
