= Hydroponicum =

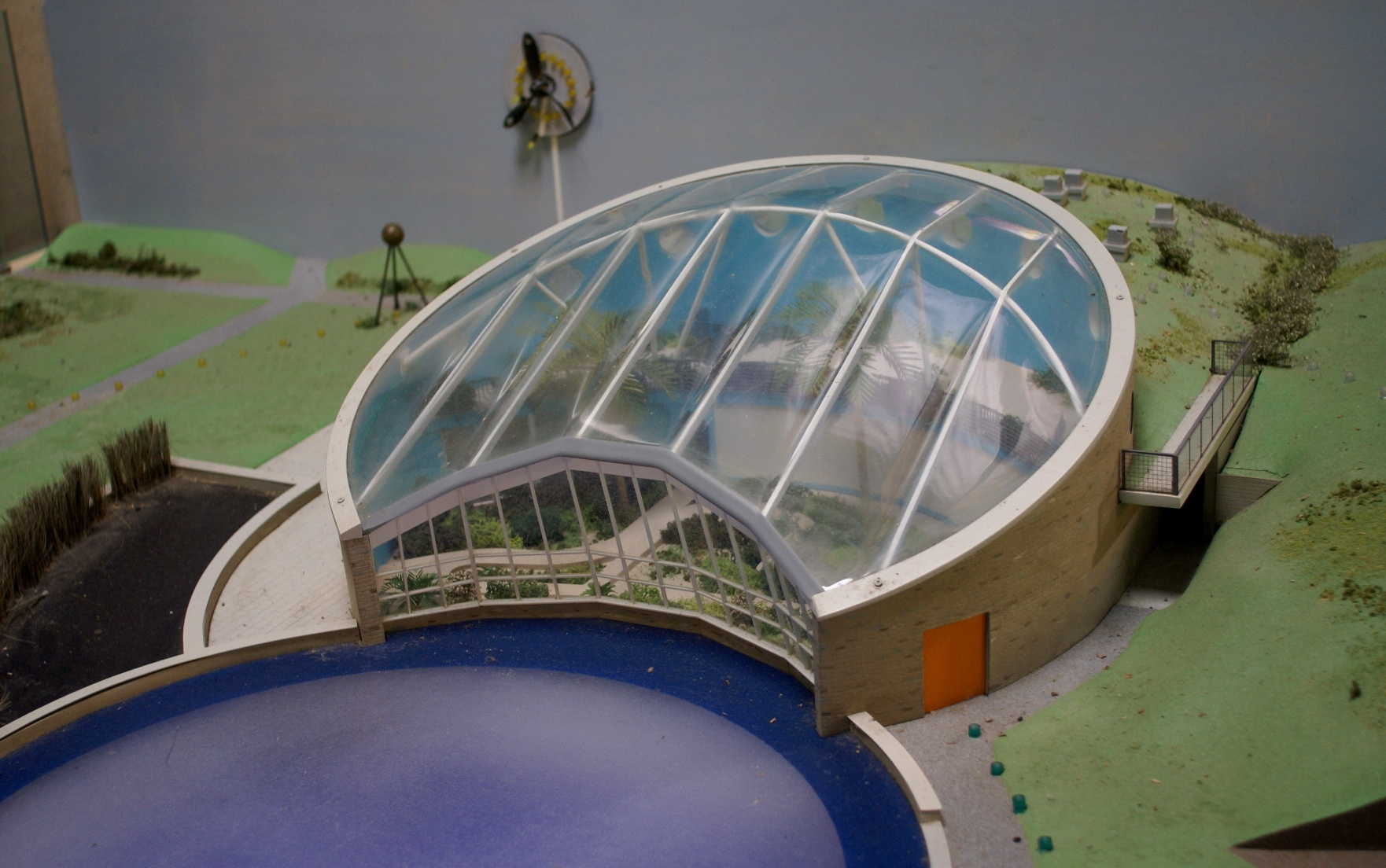
Model of a Hydroponicum, at the former Middlesbrough park Nature's World

A hydroponicum is a farm, garden, or building devoted to soilless cultivation or hydroponics. The term has been applied to dedicated structures that provide a controlled environment for protected cultivation of plants in nutrient solutions rather than in soil, typically incorporating temperature, humidity, and lighting controls alongside fertigation systems.

One of the best-known examples is The Hydroponicum at Achiltibuie in northwest Scotland, opened in 1986, which operated as a visitor attraction and demonstration facility for soilless cultivation in a northern maritime climate until its closure in the 2010s.

== See also ==
- Vertical farming
- Hydroponics
