= Intercultural Garden =

Intercultural Gardens is a project of the German Association of International Gardens (Internationale Gärten e.V.), resident in Göttingen. The project has the goal to further intercultural competence and racial integration.

== Ideas and goals ==
Gardening and leisure activities in the specially created Intercultural Gardens are meant to promote social contacts between refugees, immigrants and natives. The Intercultural Gardens aim to achieve that the proclaimed solidarity with war and political refugees can be strengthened through day-to-day contacts with refugees and immigrants. Another goal is to motivate refugees and immigrants to become active and to participate. Gardens are seen as an ideal location because immigrants and refugees often come from small farming communities and were unable to apply their farming knowledge in Germany. The Intercultural Gardens consist of parcels of land on which vegetables and herbs, including herbs of the immigrants' countries of origin, can be grown and of jointly used space for children, community events and meetings.

Activities in the gardens are also seen as a foundation for further activities. For example, vocational orientation and integration in the areas of garden design and environmental protection through visits and internships in businesses in these areas. Social integration is promoted through neighborly help and family care, teaching of the German language and help in contacting educational institutions as well as documentation and public relations.

== Development to a movement ==
The projects was founded in 1996, partially on the initiative of in-migrated families. The association was founded in 1998. Initially the project had three gardens in Göttingen. In the beginning of 2006 the initial project in Göttingen had about 300 members from about twenty countries and the movement consisted of thirty independent garden projects and more were being created. The foundation Stiftung Interkultur in Munich coordinates and supports garden projects all over Germany.

== See also ==
- Allotment gardening
- Urban horticulture

== Literature ==
- Christa Müller: Wurzeln schlagen in der Fremde. Die Internationalen Gärten und ihre Bedeutung für Integrationsprozesse (mit Praxisteil); 2002, München: ökom, ISBN 3-928244-82-5
