= Green wall =

Wall or vertical structure covered by living vegetation and growth substrate

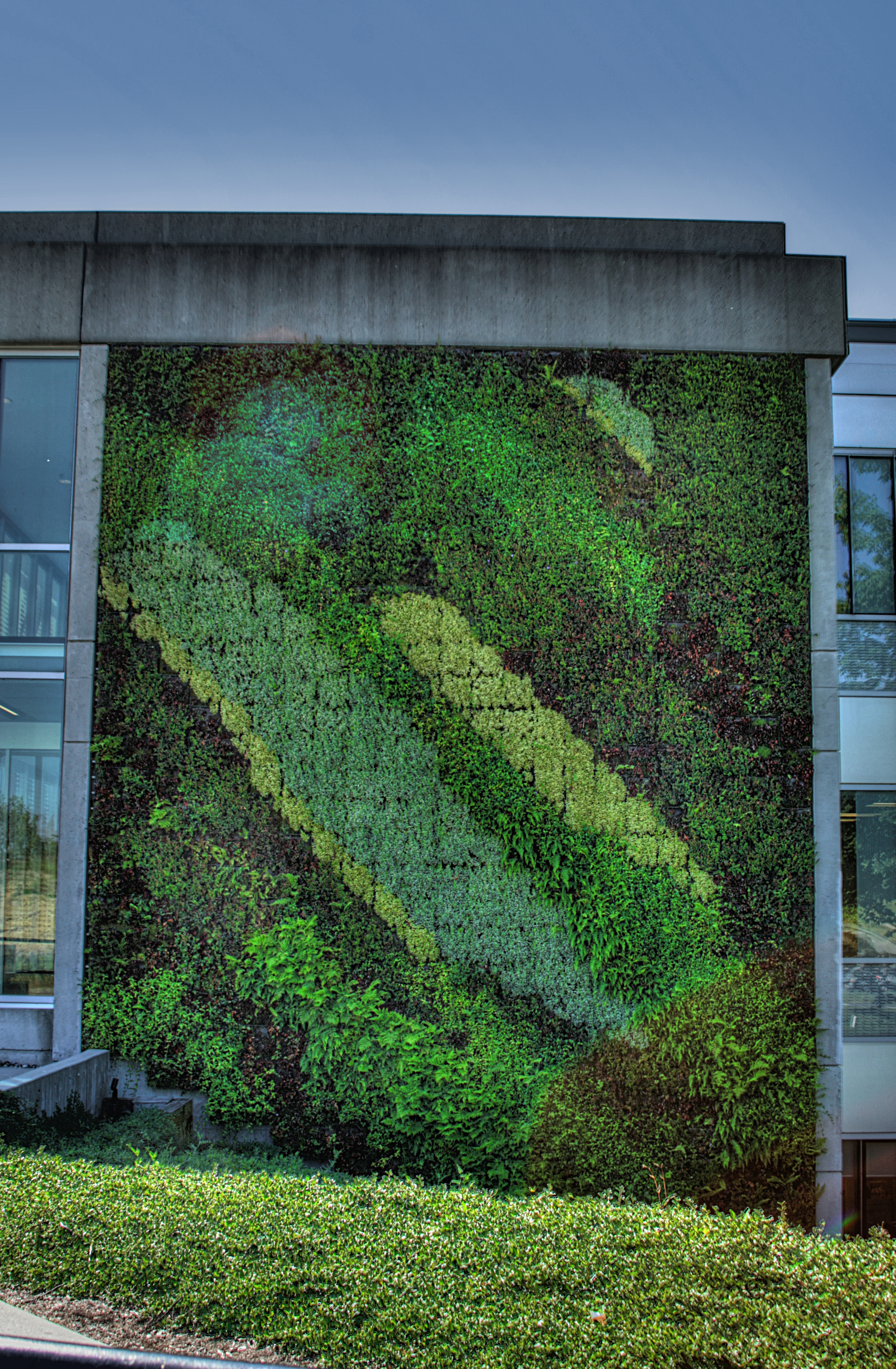
Green wall at the Simon Fraser University, Burnaby, British Columbia, Canada.

A green wall, living wall, or vertical garden is a vertical built structure intentionally covered by vegetation. Green walls include a vertically applied growth medium such as soil, substitute substrate, or hydroculture felt; and an integrated hydration and fertigation delivery system. They are often claimed to provide beneficial ecosystem services.

Green walls differ from the more established vertical greening typology of 'green facades' as they have the growth medium supported on the vertical face of the host wall (as described below), while green facades have the growth medium only at the base (either in a container or as a ground bed). Green facades typically support climbing plants that climb up the vertical face of the host wall, while green walls can accommodate a variety of plant species throughout the wall. Green walls may be implanted indoors or outdoors; as freestanding installations or attached to existing host walls; and applied in a variety of sizes.

Stanley Hart White, a Professor of Landscape Architecture at the University of Illinois from 1922 to 1959, patented a 'vegetation-Bearing Architectonic Structure and System' in 1938, though his invention did not progress beyond prototypes in his backyard in Urbana, Illinois. The popularizing of green walls is often credited to Patrick Blanc, a French botanist specialized in tropical forest undergrowth. He worked with architect Adrien Fainsilber and engineer Peter Rice to implement the first successful large indoor green wall or Mur Vegetal in 1986 at the Cité des Sciences et de l'Industrie in Paris, and has since been involved with the design and implementation of a number of notable installations (e.g. Musée du quai Branly, collaborating with architect Jean Nouvel).

Green walls have seen a surge in popularity in recent times. Many notable green walls have been installed at institutional buildings and public places, with both outdoor and indoor installations gaining significant attention. As of 2015, the largest green wall is said to cover 2,700 square meters (29,063 square feet) and is located at the Los Cabos International Convention Centre designed by Mexican architect Fernando Romero.

== Function ==
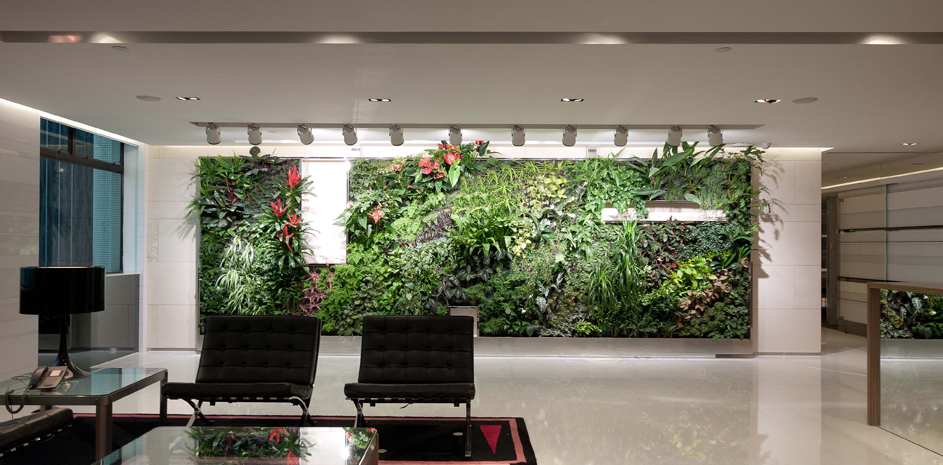
An indoor green wall in an office in Hong Kong, China.

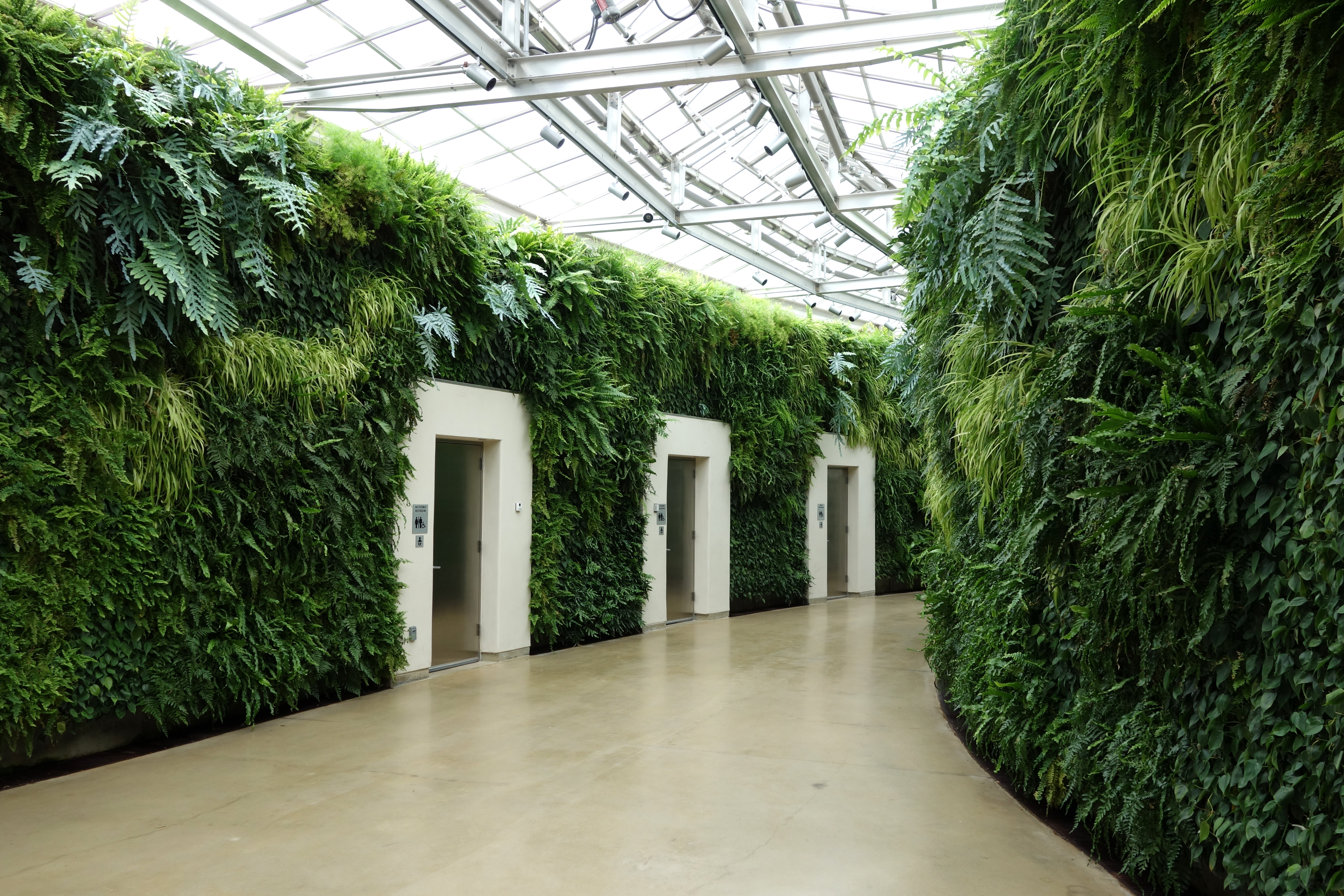
An indoor green wall in Longwood Gardens in Pennsylvania, USA.

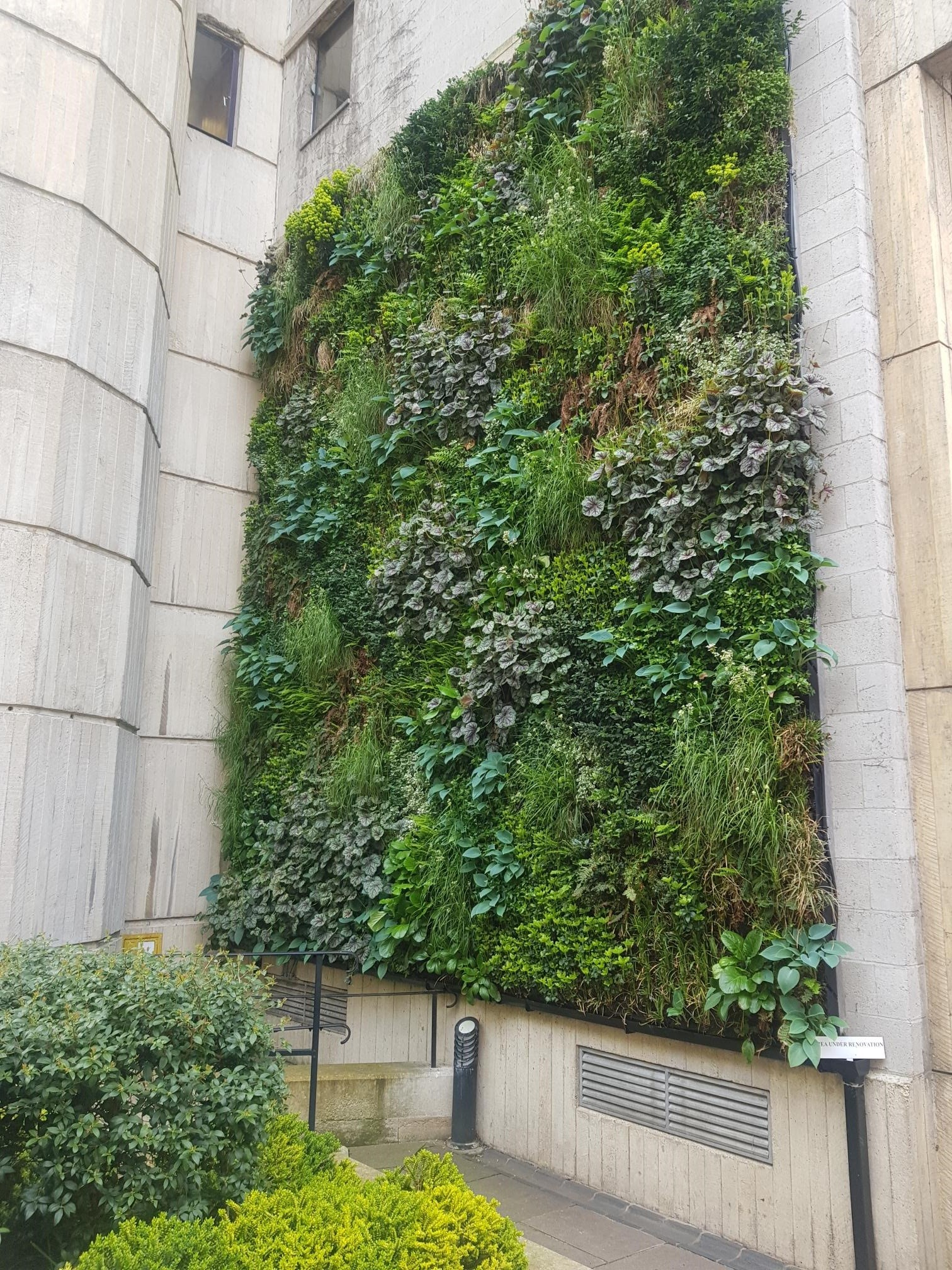
A green wall displaying a variety of ferns, hostas, and grasses, at St. Edmund Hall, Oxford University.

Green walls are found most often in urban environments where the plants reduce overall temperatures of the building. "The primary cause of heat build-up in cities is insolation, the absorption of solar radiation by roads and buildings in the city and the storage of this heat in the building material and its subsequent re-radiation. Plant surfaces however, as a result of transpiration, do not rise more than 4–5 °C above the ambient temperature and are sometimes cooler."

Living walls could function as urban agriculture, urban gardening, or provide aesthetic enhancement as art installations. They are particularly suitable for cities, as they allow good use of available vertical surface areas. They are also suitable in arid areas, as the circulating water on a vertical wall is less likely to evaporate than in horizontal gardens. It is sometimes built indoors to help alleviate sick building syndrome. Living walls are also acknowledged for remediation of poor air quality, in both internal and external environments.

=== Water management ===
Green walls provide an additional layer of insulation that can protect buildings from heavy rainwater which leads to management of heavy storm water and provides thermal mass. They may also be a means for water reuse and management, with some studies showing that plants in a living wall system can purify slightly polluted water (such as greywater) by absorbing the dissolved nutrients. Bacteria mineralize the organic components to make them available to the plants. A study is underway at the Bertschi School in Seattle, Washington, using a GSky Pro Wall system, however, conflicting meta-analysis studies show minimal correlation between living walls and greywater treatment .

=== Air quality improvement ===
They also help reduce the temperature of a building because vegetation absorbs large amounts of solar radiation. This can reduce energy demands and cleanse the air from VOCs (Volatile Organic Compounds) released by paints, furniture, and adhesives. Off-gassing from VOCs can cause headaches, eye irritation, and airway irritation and internal air pollution. Green walls can also purify the air from mold growth in building interiors that can cause asthma and allergies.

Indoor green walls can have a therapeutic effect from exposure to vegetation. The aesthetic feel and visual appearance of green walls are other examples of the benefits - but also affects the indoor climate with reduced CO_{2} level, noise level and air pollution abatement. However, to have the optimal effect on the indoor climate it is important that the plants in the green wall have the best conditions for growth, both when talking about watering, fertilizing and the right amount of light. To have the best result on all of the aforementioned, some green wall systems has special and patented technologies that is developed to the benefit of the plants.

Thomas Pugh, a biogeochemist at the Karlsruhe Institute of Technology in Germany, created a computer model of a green wall with a broad selection of vegetation. The study showed results of the green wall absorbing nitrogen dioxide and particulate matter. In street canyons where polluted air is trapped, green walls can absorb the polluted air and purify the streets.

There is also some discussion involving "active" living walls, where living walls are integrated into a buildings HVAC system, actively pulling or forcing air through the plants as a natural air quality filtration system. Regarding the added cost of design, planning and implementation of an active living wall, it is still in question whether replacing traditional air filtration systems would provide cost-savings. With further research and UL standards to support the air quality data from the living wall, building codes may one day allow for our buildings to have their air filtered by plants.

The area of air quality and plants is continuing to be researched. Early studies in this area include NASA studies performed in the 1970s and 1980s by B. C. Wolverton. There was also a study performed at the University of Guelph by Alan Darlington. Other research has shown the effect the plants have on the health of office workers.

=== Biodiversity enhancement ===
Traditional green facades are best characterized as 'Xerothermophilous' habitats comparable to cliffs, while continuous felt and modular substrate-filled living wall types are best characterized as damp and cool habitats comparable to vegetated waterfalls. Systems with increased substrate depth are typically found to offer the highest diversity and abundance of species. Biodiversity at indoor applications in contrast is likely to be significantly limited owing to the restricted ecosystems created, with introductions most likely at planting or replanting stages.

== Media types ==
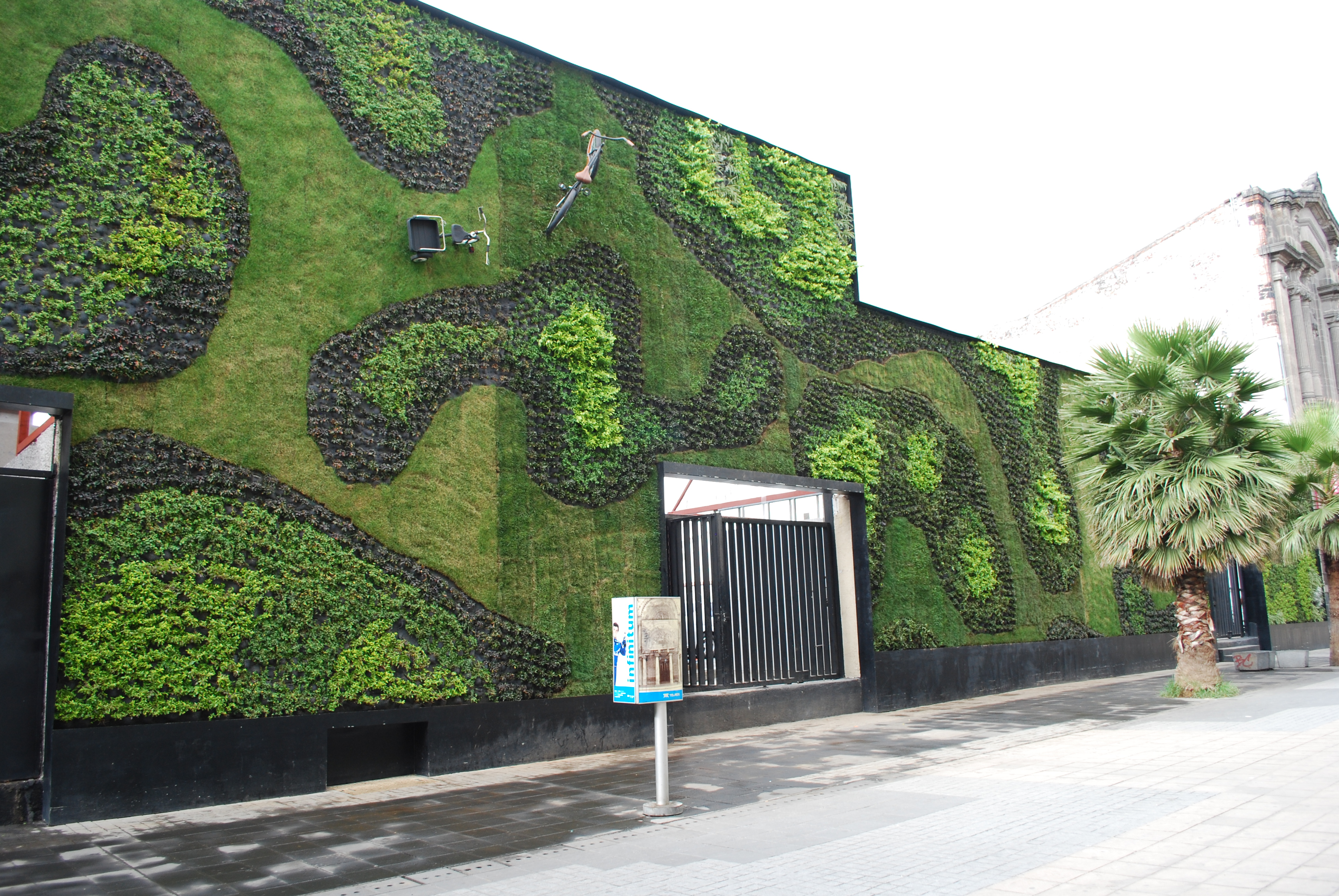
Green wall at the Universidad del Claustro de Sor Juana in the historic center of Mexico City.

Green walls are engineered systems that are constructed with a structural support layer, waterproofing and drainage layer, growing media layer, plant layer, and irrigation/fertigation layer. Green walls are often categorized according to the type of growth media used: freestanding media, media-free, loose media, mat media, and structural media.

=== Freestanding media ===
Freestanding media are portable living walls that are flexible for both exterior and interior landscaping and are considered to have many biophilic design benefits. These types of systems are commonly used for living walls within the interiorscaping industry, with modular/panel systems and tray systems being the most widely available. In a modular/panel system, geo-textile or rockwool plugs are pre-grown with plants 6-8 weeks prior to installation and then attached to the structure. In a tray system, plants are grown directly into pots in soil 6-8 weeks prior to installation, the pots are then inserted into the tray system. One downside noted regarding the tray system is due to the present of soil, plant replacements are often frequent due to fungal, insect, and other pathogens spreading, making this system more costly long-term.

=== Media-free ===
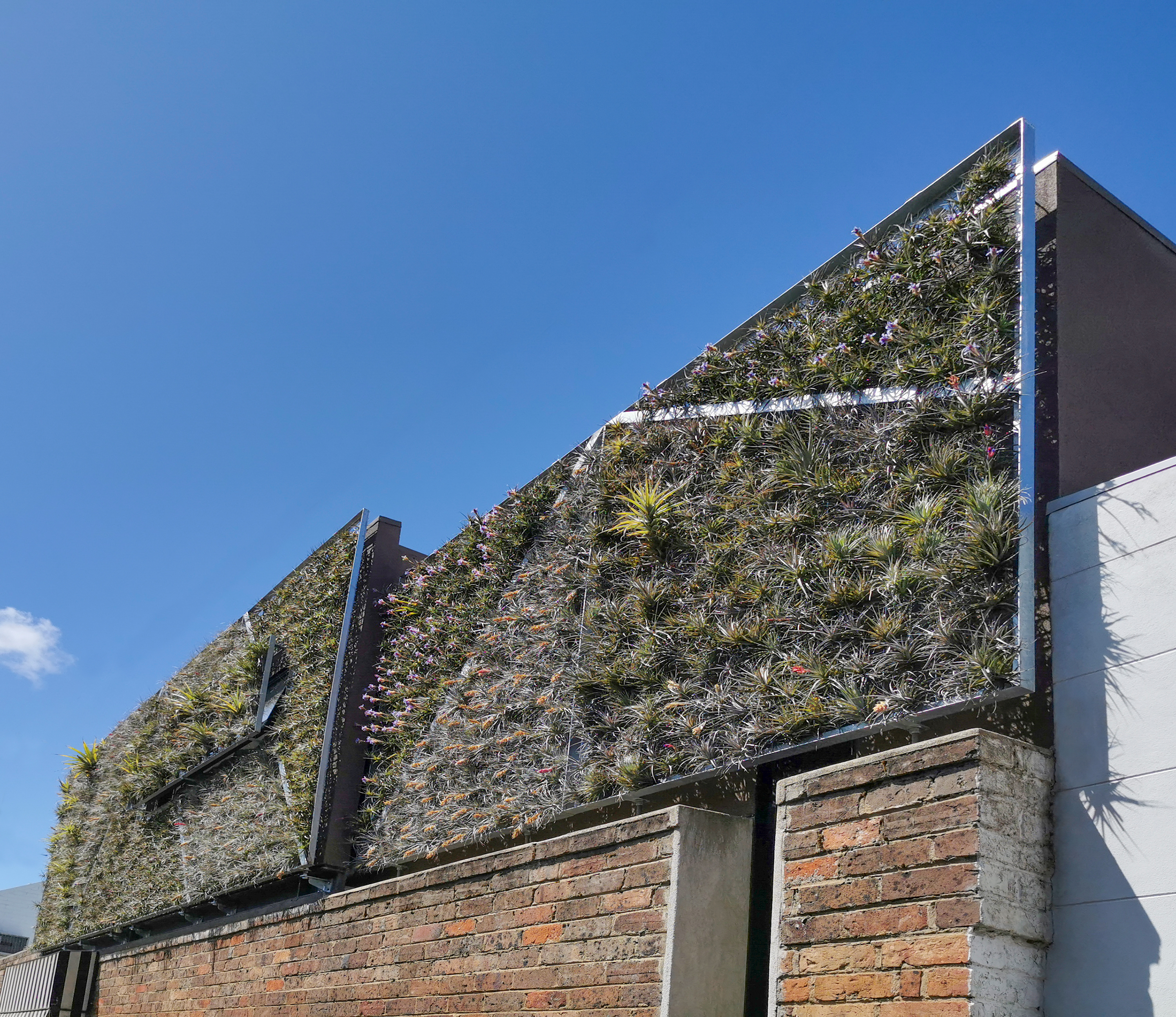
Media-free tillandsia green wall designed by Lloyd Godman, East Melbourne, Australia.

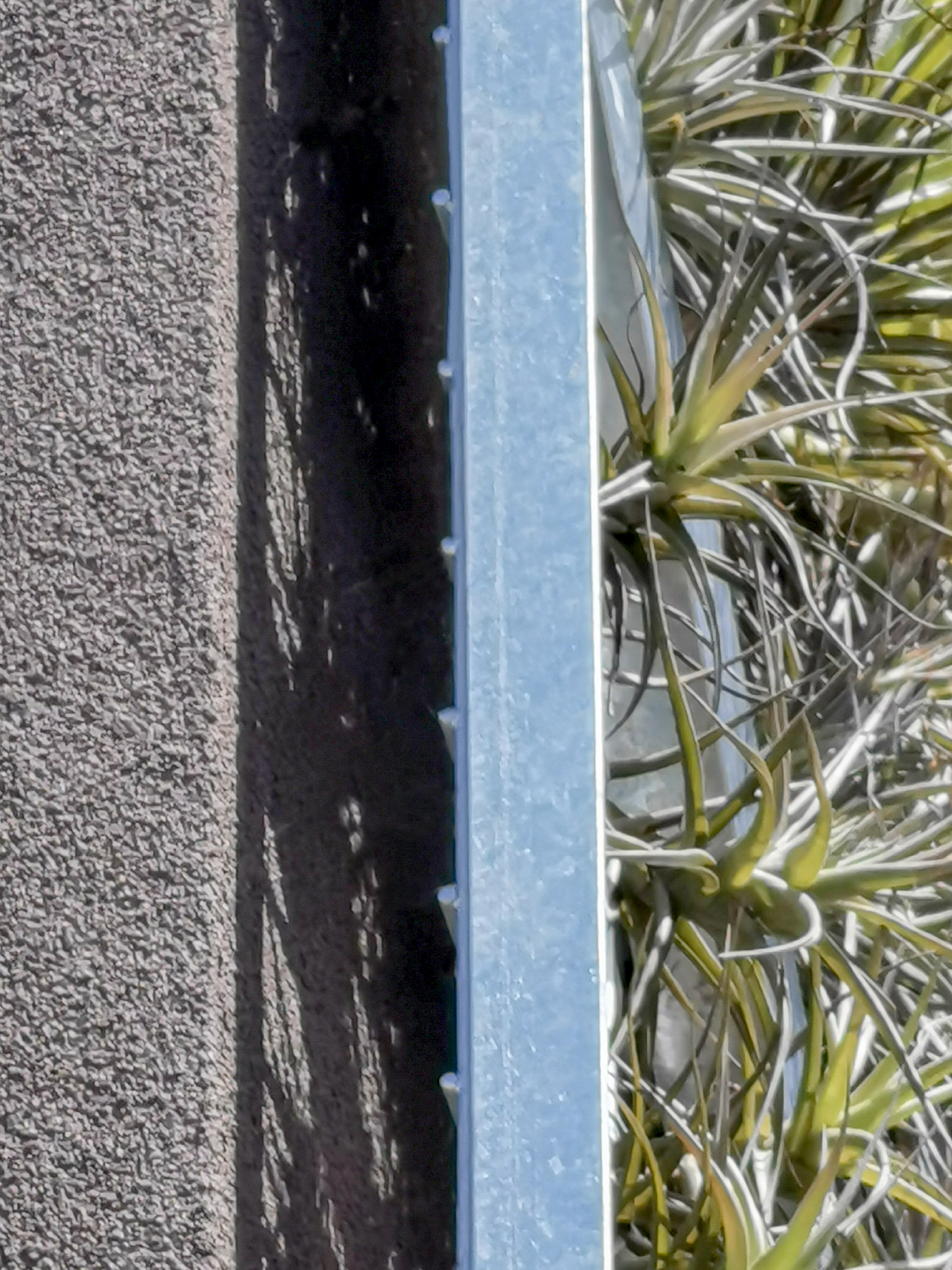
Media-free tillandsia green wall structural cross section. Designed by Lloyd Godman, East Melbourne, Australia.

Media-free green walls are those that do not require soil substrates, fertilizers, or reticulated watering systems, and which utilize a method of selecting plant species which are best suited to the local climate. Media-free green walls often use a structural steel frame that is infilled with wire mesh, which is then attached to the façade of the structure, and plants are individually attached to this wire mesh. These frames are offset from the supporting structure to allow airflow between the green wall and the supporting structure, and this offset results in additional cooling to the adjoining building.

These media-free systems result in green walls which are considerably lighter than other methods, and also require significantly less maintenance, while the risk of liquid migration into adjoining structural walls is eliminated. The plant species which can be used in media-free systems varies depending on the location of the planned green wall. Xeric plants, such as Tillandsias, can be used because they absorb available atmospheric water and nutrients via trichome leaf cells, and their roots have developed to hold onto a support structure, unlike other plants which use their roots as a medium to absorb nutrients. The other benefit of Tillandsias within a media-free system is that these plants use a crassulacean acid metabolism to photosynthesize, and they have evolved to withstand long periods of heat and drought, and as a result, these plants grow slowly and require minimal maintenance.

Every three-to-five-years, any additional plant growth can be harvested to reduce weight, and these plant pups can be utilized for additional green walls. As long as suitable species are matched to the climate of the green wall's location, then potential plant losses across any three-to-five-year period is minor. As there is no watering system involved this method eliminates potential mold, algae and moss problems that can plague other systems. Because of the lack of media and water, these screens can also be installed horizontally, and the first of these screens ever installed was for a 2023 installation on the rooftop of the City of Melbourne's Council House 2 building.

=== Loose media ===
Loose medium walls tend to be "soil-on-a-shelf" or "soil-in-a-bag" type systems. Loose medium systems have their soil packed into a shelf or bag and are then installed onto the wall. These systems require their media to be replaced at least once a year on exteriors and approximately every two years on interiors.

Loose soil systems are not well suited for areas with any seismic activity. Most importantly, because these systems can easily have their medium blown away by wind-driven rain or heavy winds, these should not be used in applications over 2.5 metres (8 ft 2 in) high. There are some systems in Asia that have solved the loose media erosion problem by use of shielding systems to hold the media within the green wall system even when soil liquefaction occurs under seismic load. In these systems, the plants can still up-root themselves in the liquified soil under seismic load, and therefore it is required that the plants be secured to the system to prevent them from falling from the wall.

Loose-soil systems without physical media erosion systems are best suited for the home gardener where occasional replanting is desired from season to season or year to year. Loose-soil systems with physical media erosion systems are well suited for all green wall applications.

=== Mat media ===
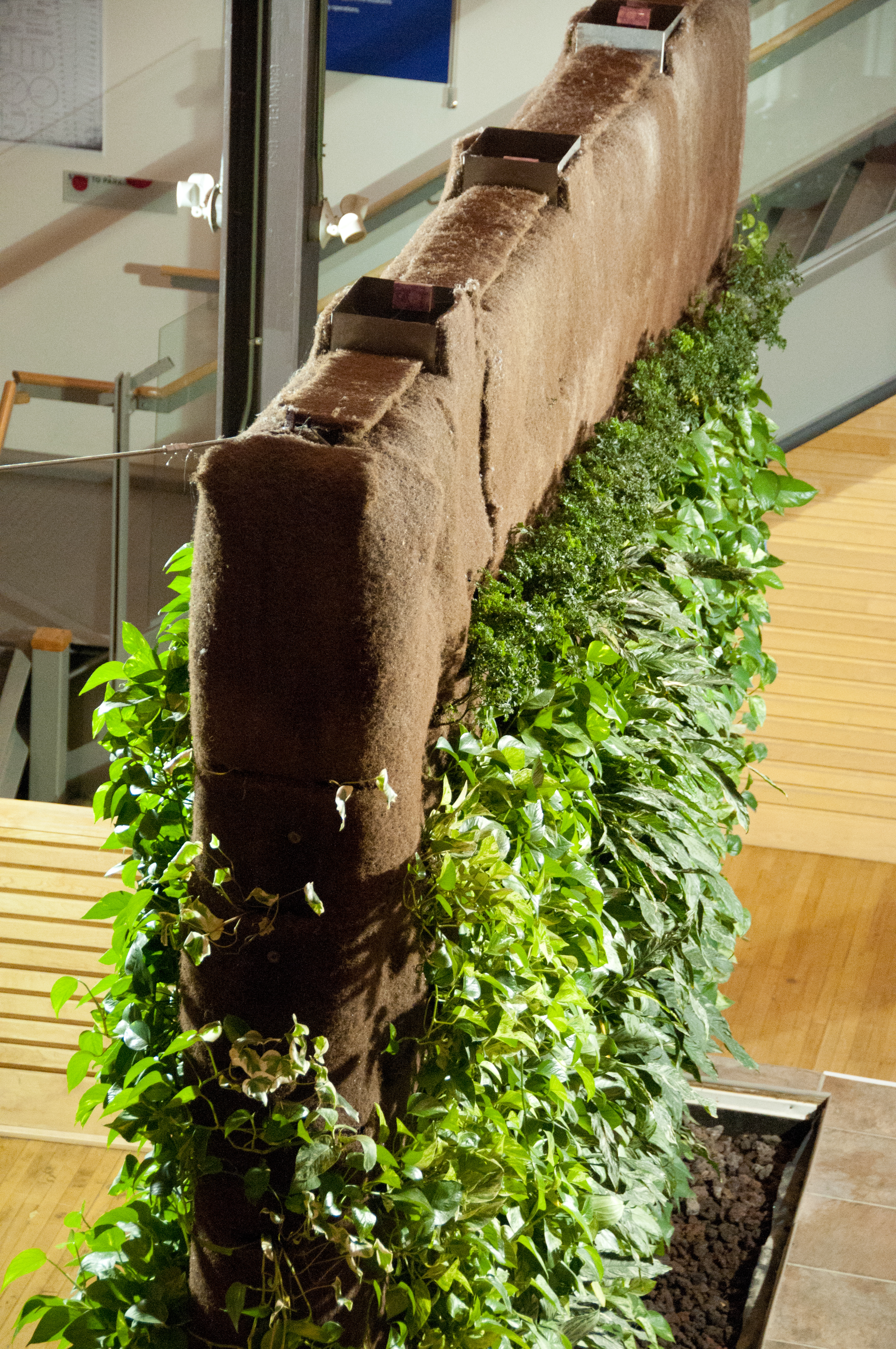
A green wall (mat media) in a children's museum, Kitchener, Ontario, Canada.

Mat type systems tend to be either coir fiber or felt mats. Mat media are quite thin, even in multiple layers, and as such cannot support vibrant root systems of mature plants for more than three to five years before the roots overtake the mat and water is not able to adequately wick through the mats.

The method of reparation of these systems is to replace large sections of the system at a time by cutting the mat out of the wall and replacing it with new mat. This process compromises the root structures of the neighboring plants on the wall and often kills many surrounding plants in the reparation process.

These systems are best used on the interior of a building and are a good choice in areas with low seismic activity and small plants that will not grow to a weight that could rip the mat apart under their own weight over time.

Mat systems are particularly water inefficient and often require constant irrigation due to the thin nature of the medium and its inability to hold water and provide a buffer for the plant roots. This inefficiency often requires that these systems have a water re-circulation system put into place at an additional cost. Mat media are better suited for small installations no more than eight feet in height where repairs are easily completed.

=== Sheet media ===
Semi-open cell polyurethane sheet media utilizing an egg crate pattern has successfully been used in recent years for both outdoor roof gardens and vertical walls. The water holding capacity of these engineered polyurethanes vastly exceeds that of coir and felt based systems. Polyurethanes do not biodegrade, and hence stay viable as an active substrate for 20+ years. Vertical wall systems utilizing polyurethane sheeting typically employ a sandwich construction where a water proof membrane is applied to the back, the polyurethane sheeting (typically two sheets with irrigation lines in between) is laid and then a mesh or anchor braces/bars secure the assembly to the wall. Pockets are cut into the face of the first urethane sheet into which plants are inserted. Soil is typically removed from the roots of any plants prior to insertion into the urethane mattress substrate. A flaked or chopped noodle version of the same polyurethane material can also be added to existing structural media mixes to boost water retention.

=== Structural media ===
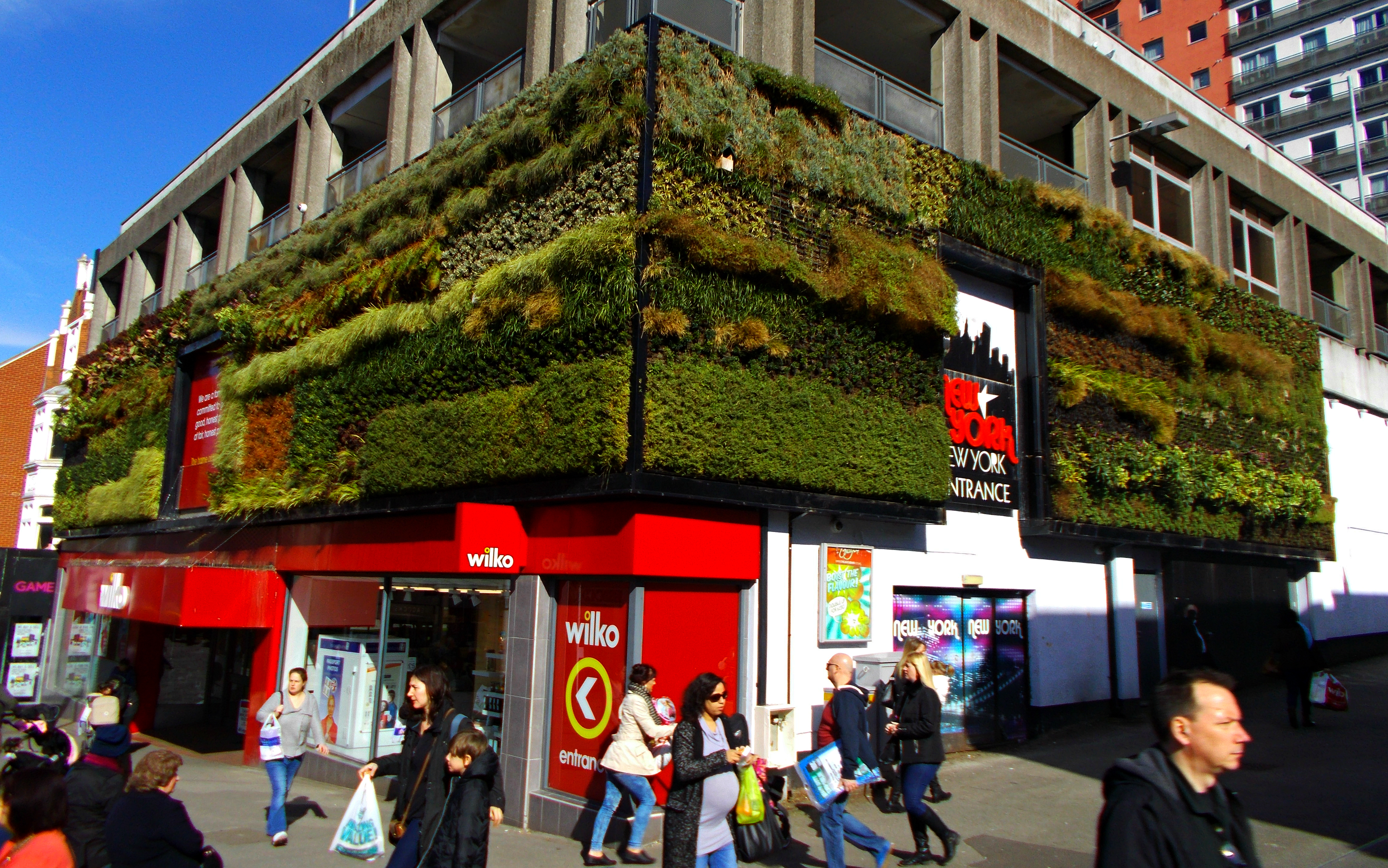
Green Wall in Sutton, Greater London

Structural media are growth medium "blocks" that are not loose, nor mats, but which incorporate features of both into a block that can be manufactured into various sizes, shapes and thicknesses. This comes with the advantage that they do not break down for 10 to 15 years, can be made to have a higher or lower water holding capacity depending on the plant selection for the wall, can have their pH and electrical conductivity customized to suit the plants, and are easily handled for maintenance and replacement.

== Plants ==
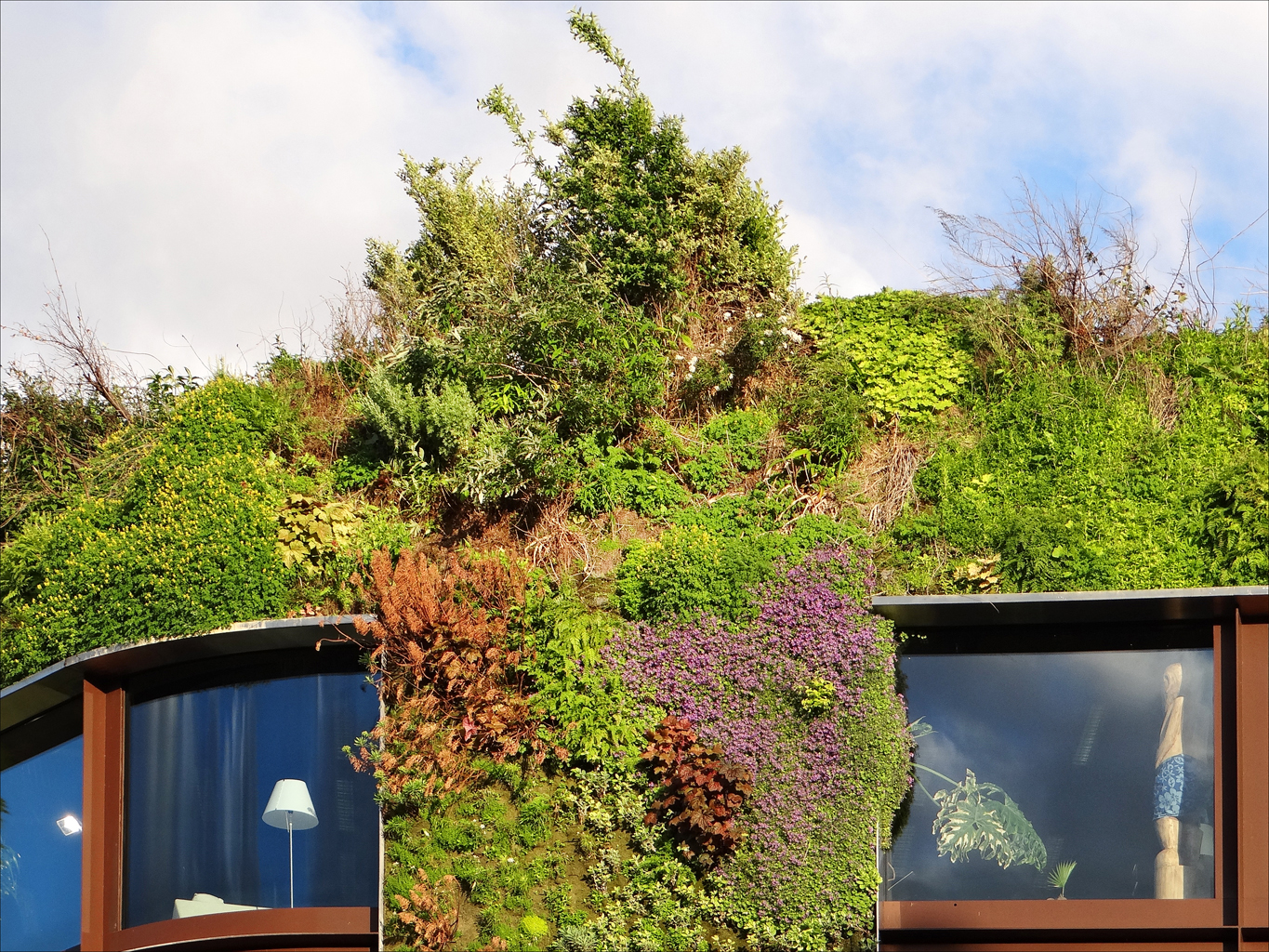
Detail of Patrick Blanc's exterior green wall of the Musée du Quai Branly in Paris, France.

Changi Airport, 2019, Singapore.

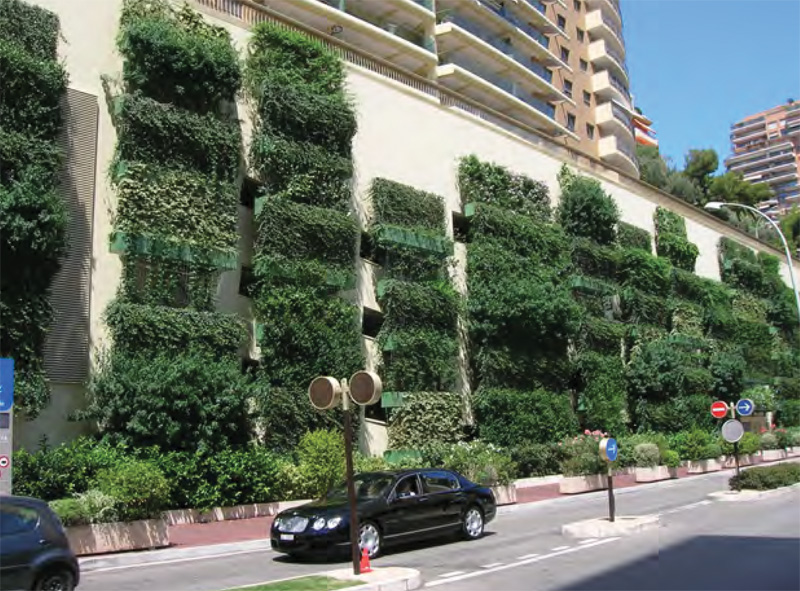
Vertical garden on a building in Monaco.

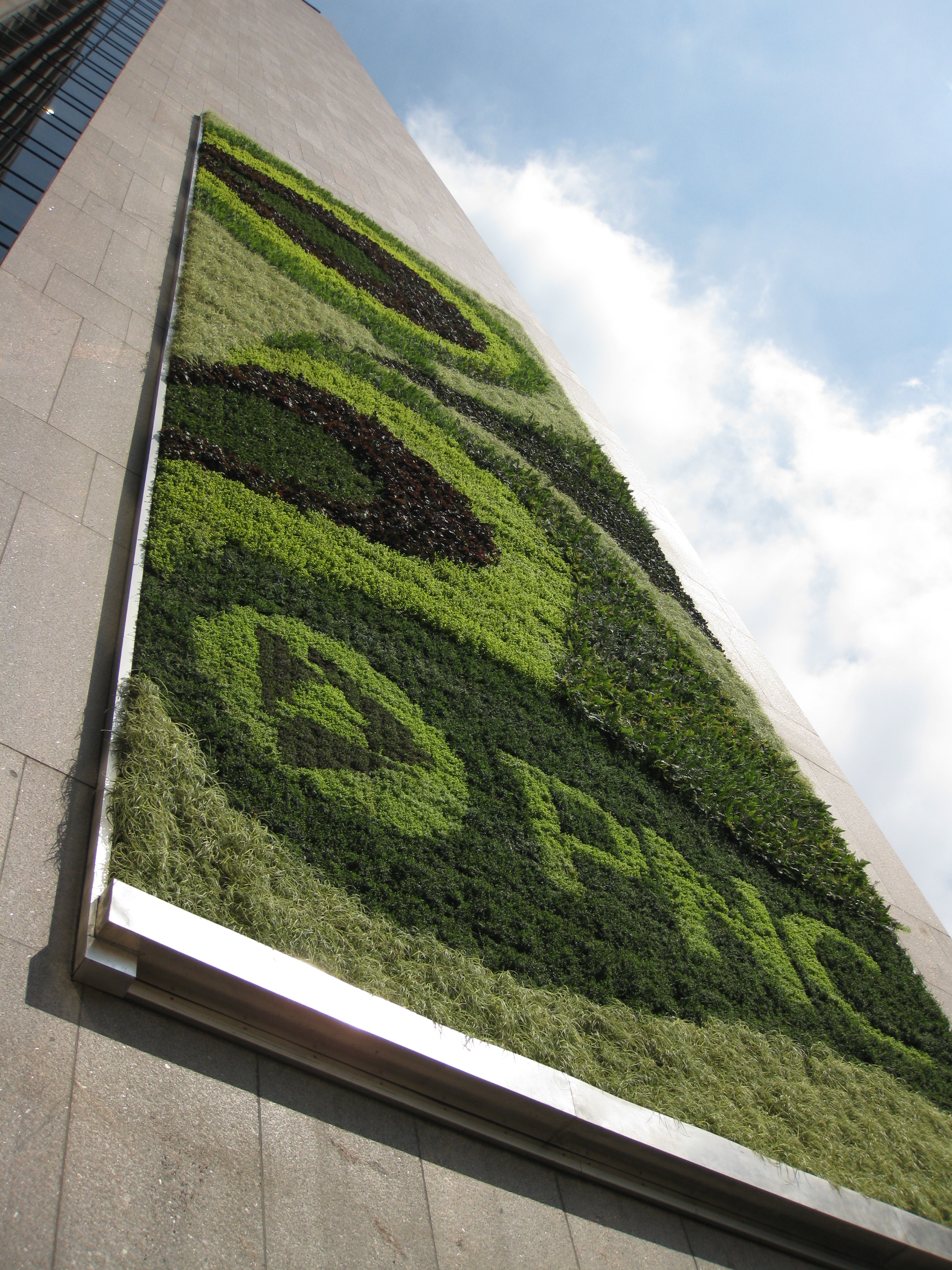
Green wall at the PNC Bank building in Pittsburgh, USA.

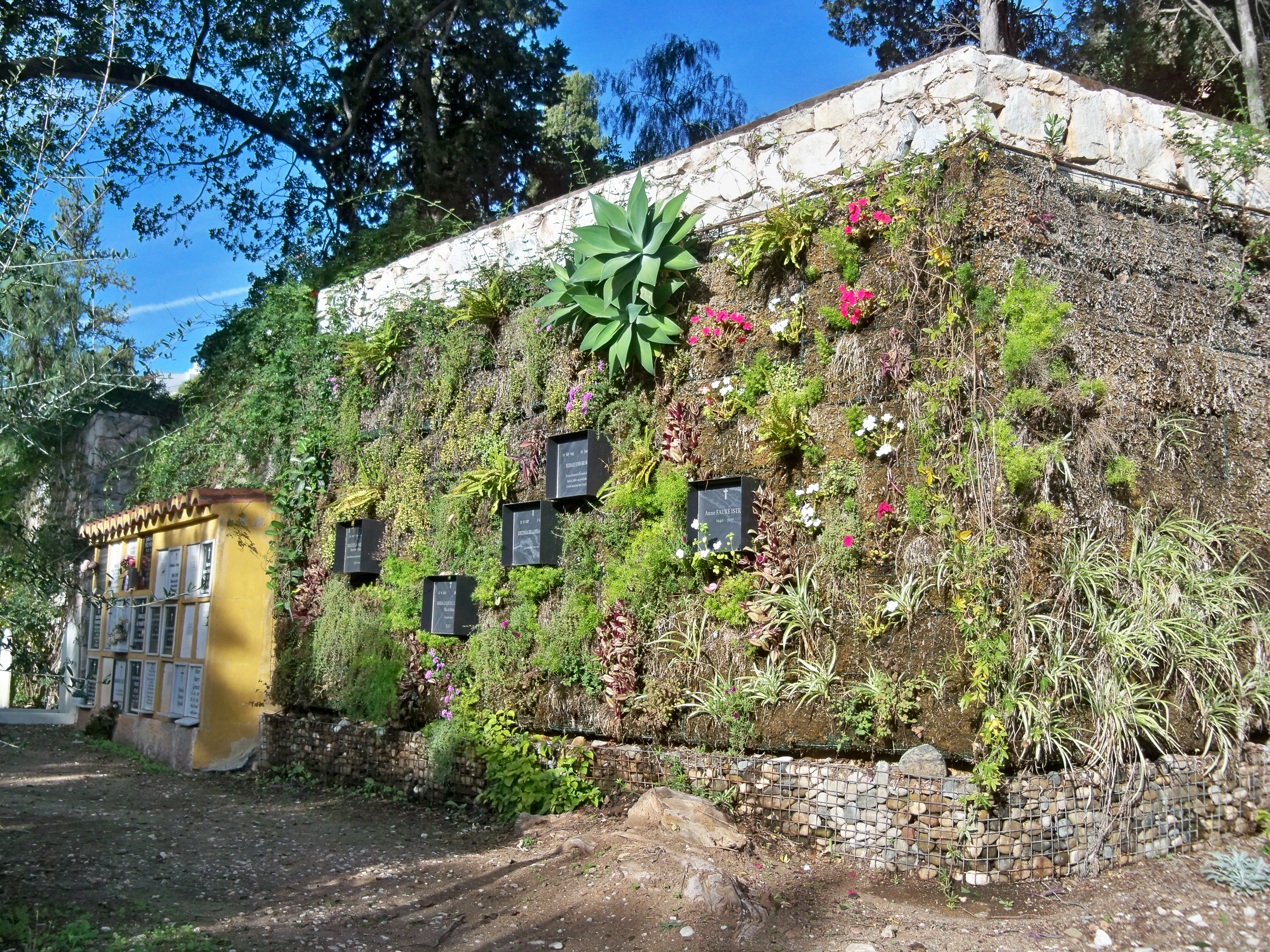
Vertical garden on the columbarium of Spanish writer and playwright Miguel Romero Esteo at the English Cemetery in Málaga, Spain.

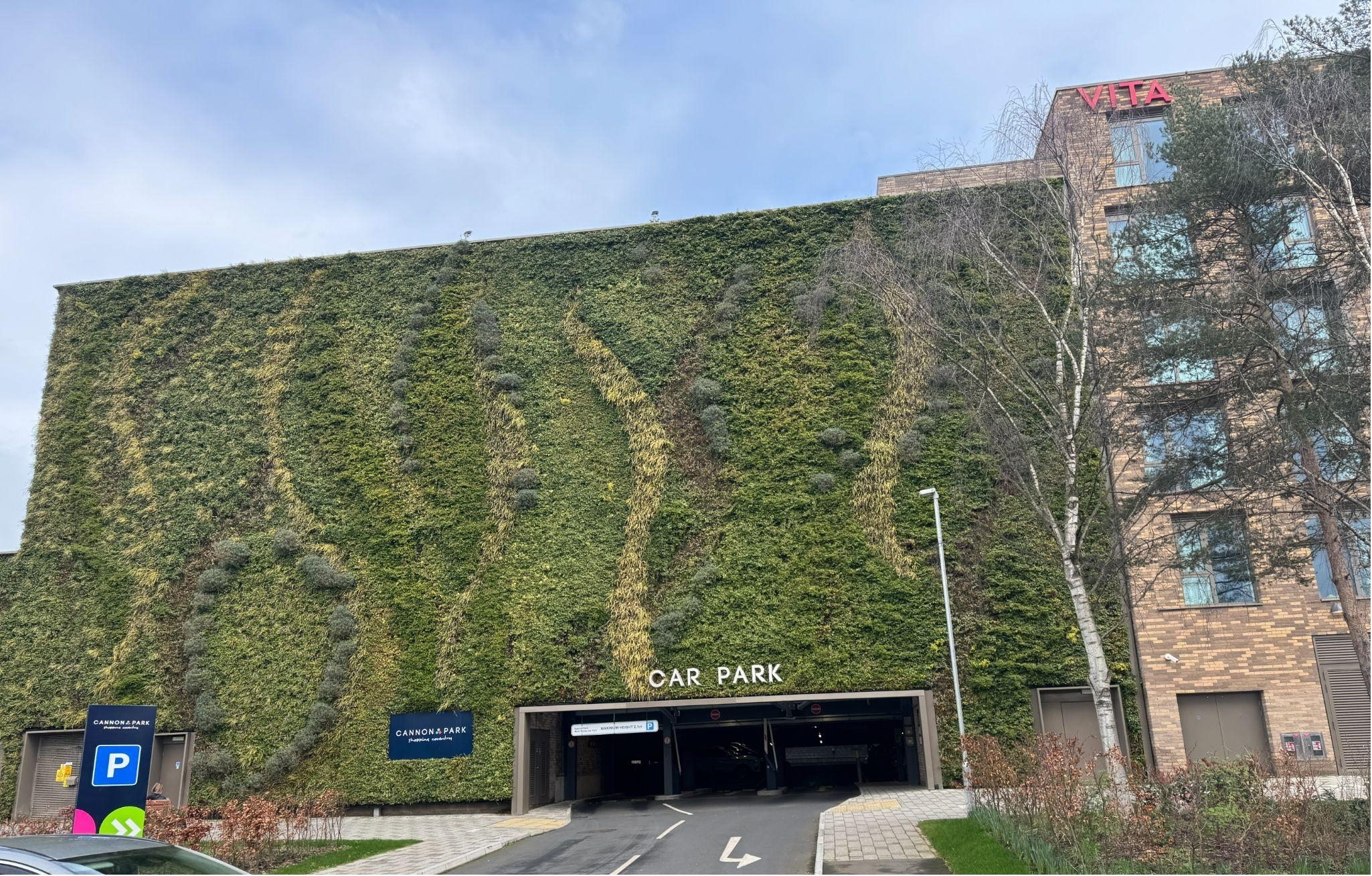
Green Wall at a car park in Coventry, England

An example of a "green facade", with Boston ivy covering a building on the University of Chicago campus, Illinois

While the following plants listed are commonly used in green walls, considerations need to be made regarding purpose/scope, scale, environmental conditions and hardiness when selecting plants for each green wall project.

Peppers grown on the wall of a house in Cugir, Romania.

=== Plants best suited for media-free green walls ===
- Aechmea
- Tillandsia
- Vriesea

=== Plants best suited for interior green walls ===
- Aeschynanthus radicans
- Calathea
- Chlorophytum comosum
- Dracaena fragrans
- Epipremnum aureum
- Ficus elastica
- Monstera
- Philodendron
- Heptapleurum arboricola

=== Plants best suited for green walls in full sun ===
- Achillea
- Acorus
- Armeria maritima
- Bergenia
- Bidens
- Calamintha nepeta
- Carex
- Convolvulus cneorum
- Erica
- Geranium
- Lavender
- Liriope
- Pansy
- Pepper
- Rosemary
- Sedum
- Solidago
- Thymus
- Westringia

=== Plants best suited for green walls in shade ===
- Adiantum
- Asplenium
- Begonia
- Bergenia
- Erica
- Euphorbia
- Heuchera
- Polystichum
- Snowdrop

=== Edible plants best suited for vertical gardens ===
- Chard
- Cherry tomatoes
- Dwarf cabbages
- Lettuce
- Radishes
- Rocket
- Small chili peppers
- Pepper
- Spinach
- Strawberries
- Watercress

=== Herbs best suited for vertical gardens ===
- Basil
- Bay laurel
- Caraway
- Chamomile
- Chives
- Coriander
- Dill
- Lavender
- Lemon balm
- Lemongrass
- Marjoram
- Mint
- Oregano
- Parsley
- Rosemary
- Sage
- Sorrel
- Tarragon
- Thyme

== See also ==
- Building-integrated agriculture
- CityTrees
- Folkewall
- Greening
- Green building
- Great Green Wall (Africa)
- Great Green Wall (China)
- Green roof
- The Hanging Gardens of Babylon
- Hedgerow
- Hügelkultur
- Roof garden
- Vertical farming
- Bosco Verticale ('Vertical Forest')
- Vertical ecosystem

== Sources ==
- Clapp, L., & Klotz, H. (2018). Vertical gardens. London; Sydney; Auckland: New Holland.
- Coronado, S. (2015). Grow a living wall - create vertical gardens with purpose: Pollinators - he. Cool Springs Press.
- Hyatt, B. (2017, June 29). The ins and outs of green wall installation and maintenance. Retrieved March 2, 2019, from https://www.totallandscapecare.com/landscaping/green-wall-maintenance/
- Manso, Maria; Castro-Gomes, João (January 2015). "Green wall systems: A review of their characteristics". Renewable and Sustainable Energy Reviews. 41: 863–871. Bibcode:2015RSERv..41..863M. doi:10.1016/j.rser.2014.07.203. S2CID 110322582.
- Gunawardena, K., & Steemers, K. (2019). Living walls in indoor environments. Building and Environment, 148 (January 2019), 478–487. Living walls in indoor environments
- Pictures: Green Walls May Cut Pollution in Cities. (2016, May 17). Retrieved from https://news.nationalgeographic.com/news/2013/03/pictures/130325-green-walls-environment-cities-science-pollution/
- Reggev, K. (2018, January 18). Living Green Walls 101: Their Benefits and How They're Made. Retrieved March 2, 2019, from https://www.dwell.com/article/living-green-walls-101-their-benefits-and-how-theyre-made-350955f3
- Thomas A. M. Pugh; A. Robert MacKenzie; J. Duncan Whyatt; C. Nicholas Hewitt (2012). "The effectiveness of green infrastructure for improvement of air quality in urban street canyons" (PDF). Environmental Science & Technology. 46 (14): 7692–7699. Bibcode:2012EnST...46.7692P. doi:10.1021/es300826w. PMID 22663154.
- Visone, M. (2019). Down to the Vertical Gardens. Compasses, 32, 33-40. Down to the Vertical Gardens
