= Controlled-environment agriculture =

Technology-based approach toward food growing

Controlled-environment agriculture (CEA) -- which includes indoor agriculture (IA) and vertical farming— consists of crop production systems in greenhouses or other structures that use horticulture and engineering techniques beyond conventional soil-based outdoor production. These systems may increase yields, improve access to local foods, provide year-round food access and improve nutritional outcomes relative to traditional large scale farming. The aim of CEA is to provide protection from the outdoor elements and maintain optimal growing conditions throughout the development of the crop. Production takes place within an enclosed growing structure such as a mushroom farm, greenhouse or plant factory. CEA based greenhouses are very common although vertical farming has struggled financially. Some methods of harvesting like cut-and-come again can be profitable for high value crops like greens in vertical farms.

CEA covers two sectors: plant growing systems that evolved from greenhouses or aquaculture based structures requiring light and mushroom (fungi) growing systems that evolved from fully enclosed structures with limited lighting.

Plants are often grown in a soilless medium in order to supply the proper amounts of water and nutrients to the root zone as well as supplemental lighting to ensure a sufficient daily light integral. CEA plant growing optimizes the use of resources such as water, energy, space, capital and labor. CEA technologies include hydroponics, aeroponics, aquaculture, and aquaponics.

Mushrooms are grown in a compost medium with temperature, humidity, lighting, supplemental nutrients and atmospheric supplements, such as Oxygen or CO_{2}, added depending on the type of crop.

Different techniques are available for growing food in controlled environment agriculture. As of 2019 the mushroom industry was the largest CEA sector in the United States by facility size and total value of sales. The greenhouse industry is the second largest component of the CEA industry but another quickly growing segment is the vertical farming industry. Controlled Environment Agriculture has the ability to produce crops all year round, with the possibility of increased yield by adjusting the amount of carbon and nutrients the plants receive.

== Facilities ==
CEA farms are mainly located in buildings resembling warehouses, but other types of are used as well. Although CEA facilities share common characteristics for greenhouses, mushroom farms, and other indoor agricultural practices, they require different types of buildings, technologies, and workforce skills, such as software programming. CEA is also distinct from medical marijuana growing and processing. In contrast to CEA systems used for greens and herbs, mushrooms can be produced in locations with minimal infrastructure and capital to start and maintain production. Mushroom production can be adapted to abandoned and underutilized farm infrastructure including barns, outbuildings, high tunnels and storage facilities.

In consideration to urban agriculture, CEA can exist inside repurposed structures, built to purpose structures or in basements and subterranean spaces. The trend is increasingly growing into alternative food networks, as entrepreneurs and households seek to meet the growing demand for fresh food products.

== Technical implementation ==
Controllable variables:

Environmental:

- Temperature (air, nutrient solution, root-zone, leaf)
- Relative Humidity (%RH)
- Carbon dioxide (CO_{2})
- Light (intensity, spectrum, duration and intervals)

Cultural:

- Water Quality
- Nutrient concentration (PPM of Nitrogen, Potassium, Phosphorus, etc.)
- Nutrient pH (acidity)
- Cropping duration and density
- Cultivar
- Pest controls

CEA facilities can range from fully 100% environmentally controlled enclosed closed loop systems, to automated glasshouses with computer controls for watering, lighting and ventilation. Low-tech solutions such as cloches or plastic film on field grown crops and plastic-covered tunnels are referred to as modified environment agriculture.

CEA methods can be used to grow literally any crop, though the reality is a crop has to be economically viable and this will vary considerably due to local market pricing, and resource costs. Currently, tomatoes, leafy greens and herbs are the most economically viable crops.

== Motivation ==
Crops can be grown for food, pharmaceutical and nutriceutical applications. It can also be used to grow algae for food or for biofuels.

CEA methods can increase food safety by removing sources of contamination, and increases the security of supply as it is unaffected by outside environment conditions and eliminates seasonality to create a stable market pricing, which is good for both farmers and consumers. The use of monitoring software and automation can greatly reduce the amount of human labor required.

CEA is used in research so that a specific aspect of production can be isolated while all other variables remain the same. For example, the use of tinted greenhouse glass could be compared to clear glass in this way during an investigation into photosynthesis.

A February 2011 article in the magazine Science Illustrated states, "In commercial agriculture, CEA can increase efficiency, reduce pests and diseases, and save resources. ... Replicating a conventional farm with computers and LED lights is expensive but proves cost-efficient in the long run by producing up to 20 times as much high-end, pesticide-free produce as a similar-size plot of soil. Fourteen thousand square feet of closely monitored plants produce 15 million seedlings annually at the solar-powered factory. Such factories will be necessary to meet urban China's rising demand for quality fruits and vegetables."

Advantages of CEA over traditional field farming:

- Water efficiency
- Space use efficiency
- Reduced transportation requirements
- Reliable year-round production
- Protection from adverse weather events
- Reduce fertilizer runoff
- Pleasant working conditions

=== Urban impacts ===
According to the findings of a USDA workshop in 2018:

indoor agriculture (IA) in urban and near-urban areas has the potential to act as a consistent, local, and accessible producer and distributor of fresh produce. If these farms are placed strategically, this possibility of local food production, processing, and distribution could be especially impactful for urban areas without reliable access to affordable and fresh produce. Such farms could also have far-reaching impacts in traditionally underserved communities by creating opportunities for training employment and business development in an emerging sector.

== Industry ==
The US mushroom growing sector reported 19,473 million square feet of indoor mushroom farms in the 2022-2023 growing cycle.

The CEA plant growing sector reported 16.55 million square feet (380 acres / 154 hectares) of indoor farms operating around the world as of mid-2021. The State of Indoor Farming annual report suggested this would grow to 22 million sq. ft. (505 acres / 204 hectares) by 2022. (By comparison, the USDA reported 915 million acres (38 million hectares) of farmland in the United States in 2012.)

As of 2018, an estimated 40 indoor vertical farms existed in the United States, some of which produced commercially sold produce and others which were not yet selling to consumers. Another source estimated over 100 startups in the space of 2018. In Asia, adoption of indoor agriculture has been driven by consumer demand for quality. The Recirculating Farms Coalition is a US trade organization for hydroponic farmers.

A 2020 survey of indoor plant farming in the U.S. found that indoor production was:

- 26% leafy greens,
- 20% herbs
- 16% microgreens
- 10% tomatoes
- 28% other

AeroFarms, founded in 2011, raised $40 million in 2017 and reportedly opened the largest indoor farm in the world in Newark, New Jersey in 2015; by 2018 it built its 10th indoor farm. As of June 2023, AeroFarms filed for Chapter 11 bankruptcy protection citing "significant industry and capital market headwinds".

Premier Mushrooms, founded in 2001 as Colusa Mushrooms, was reportedly one of the first, nearly fully closed-loop growing CEA facilities in the United States with a farm located in Colusa, California. Premier Mushroom went through bankruptcy restructuring in 2004 and 2009, eventually being sold to an international operator in 2020.

=== Economics ===
The economics of indoor farming has been challenging, with high capital investment and energy operating costs—particularly the price of electricity—and several startups shut down as a result. A 2018 U.S. survey found only 51% of indoor farming operations profitable. One approach to overcoming the energy cost limitations of CEA is to couple it with low-cost agrivoltaic electricity generation. This has been done when Food Security and Structures Canada developed an agrivoltaic agrotunnel, which uses: (1) high R-value insulation for a building dedicated to vertical growing, (2) high-efficiency light emitting diode lighting, (3) heat pumps, and (4) solar photovoltaics (PVs) to provide known electric costs for 25 years.

A 2020 U.S. survey found that typical indoor agriculture crops, per pound of crop yield, consumed between US$0.47 (for leafy greens) and US$1.38 (for microgreens) in inputs (especially seed, growing media, and nutrients) -- though tomatoes were reported at US$0.06 inputs per pound. Labor costs for container farms were reported at US$2.35 per pound. However, the same survey noted that indoor agriculture yields more revenue per pound than conventional field agriculture.

In the Asia-Pacific region, where burgeoning population growth conflicts with burgeoning space requirements for agriculture to feed the population, indoor farming is expected to have a compound annual growth rate (CAGR) of 29%, growing from a 2021 value of US$0.77 billion to a 2026 value of US$2.77 billion.

Advances in LED lighting have been one of the most important advances for improving economic viability. The high financial cost of investing in CEA presents a challenge that can only be overcome through research & development to innovate sustainable practices. The production potential of these farm networks justifies the investment in infrastructural value and contributes towards the 2030 SDGS to combat carbon footprint.

=== Organic agriculture ===
In 2017, the US National Organic Standards Board voted to allow hydroponically grown produce to be labeled as certified organic.

== See also ==
- Building-integrated agriculture
- Controlled Environment Agriculture Center (CEAC) at the University of Arizona
- Vertical farming
