= Folkewall =

Water purifying plant wall

The Folkewall is a construction with the dual functions of growing plants and purifying greywater. It was designed by Folke Günther in Sweden.

Inspired by the "Sanitas wall" at Dr Gösta Nilsson's Sanitas farm project in Botswana, this technique makes an efficient use of space by fulfilling two essential functions: vertical plant growing and purification of greywater. This system is also known as a living wall or green wall.

== Design ==
The basic design is a wall of hollow concrete slabs, with compartments opening on one or both sides of the wall. The hollows are filled with inert material like gravel, expanded clay aggregate, perlite, or vermiculite. It is designed to let the water trickle over the longest possible treatment path along the length of the wall among the pebbles.

The water is brought in at the top, and percolates following a zigzag pattern inside the wall. As it does so, the plant roots grow among the inert material and extract nutrients from the water. A film of beneficial bacteria grows over the pebbles, releasing the nutrients in the percolating greywater. At the bottom of the wall a container collects the purified water, which can then be used for non-potable household use, for watering the garden, or it can be returned to the top of the wall.

== Other considerations ==
Plants used: since the harvesting of the plants is a part of the purification process, fast-growing, herbaceous crops are particularly suited for the Folkewall. Annual food crops are suitable, perennials like trees and shrubs should be avoided.

Greywater: The water feeding the plants in the wall must be free of heavy metals and/or unsafe pollutants, notably human waste.

== Advantages ==
- Better use of greywater: most of the evaporation happens through the plant's leaves, which makes the method especially useful in arid climates. The Folkewall makes use of this aspect.
- More efficient use of the area. For example in greenhouses or other glazed areas where a wall is used as a greywater purification device, it also works as a heat exchanger and buffer.
- Purification of the percolating water, so greywater can be used as irrigation water.
- In warm climates, the wall can be used on the sunny side to cool the building.
- Low-cost housing: the combined use of Folkewalls and source-separating toilets would "reduce the infrastructure cost by about 30%".
