= Association for Vertical Farming =

International nonprofit organization

- Founded: July 2013 in Munich, Germany
- Founder: Max Lössl, Henry Gordon-Smith, Philipp Wagner, Christine Zimmermann-Lössl, Jasper den Besten, Mick de Kok, Nick Hogervorst, Susanna Lössl, Ernst Lössl, Marius von Pawel
- Type: Non-profit, NPO
- Headquarters: Munich, Germany
- Location: Global
- Website: www.vertical-farming.net

The Association for Vertical Farming e. V. (AVF) is the global, non-profit organization that enables international exchange and cooperation in order to accelerate the development of the Indoor/Vertical Farming industry.

Founded in Munich, Germany on July 18, 2013, it initially focused on mapping global urban farms and creating a glossary to simplify vertical farming methods for newcomers.

The AVF hosts summits, workshops, and info days and collaborates with other organizations around the world.

== Vision ==
The AVF acknowledges that vertical farming in its current state can provide access to fresh, safe, and sufficient food, independent of climate and location. In the decades to come, where overpopulation and severe planetary changes challenge our current way of life, vertical farming will become a necessary solution in global food production.

== History ==
Date	Event
2019, May	Fifth AVF Summit, Oslo, Norway
2018, September	Fourth AVF Summit Hong Kong
2017, September	Third AVF Summit in conjunction with the University of the District of Columbia’s Agricultural Summit Washington D.C., U.S.
2016, June 13	Second AVF Summit Amsterdam, The Netherlands
2015, May 9–10	First AVF Summit Beijing, China
2014, December 5–6	First Collaborative Design workshop in New York City, U.S.
2014 September	First Vertical Farming Glossary was released publicly
2014, July 8	First Vertical Farming infoday in Munich, Germany
2014 March	AVF launched a new website with an interactive online map displaying over 150 Vertical and Urban Farming locations
2013 July 18	Foundation of the AVF in Munich, Germany
