= Grow shop =

Retail store selling equipment for growing plants indoors

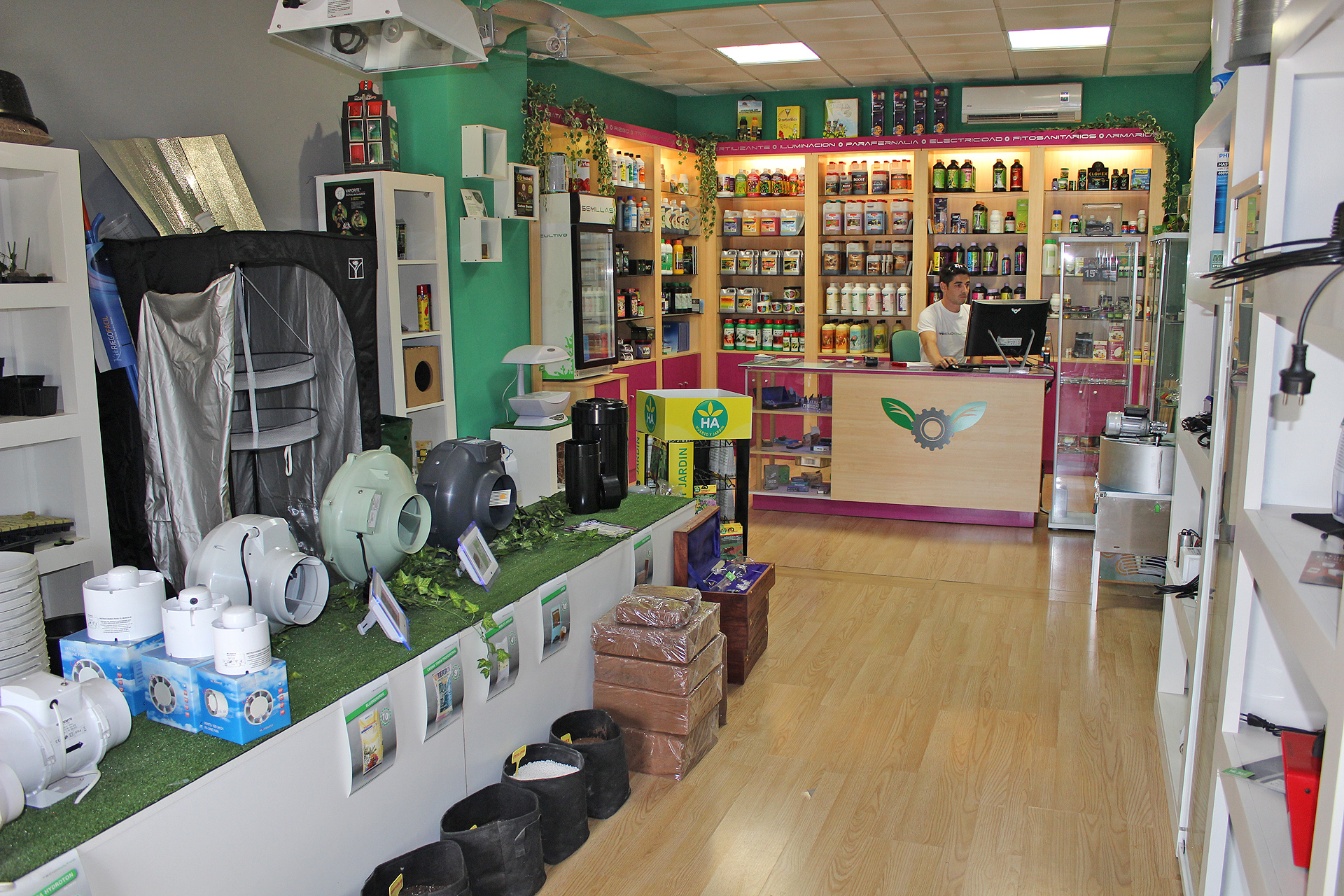
A grow shop in Valencia, Spain

A grow shop or growshop is a retail store that sells equipment and supplies for growing plants indoors. Types include stores selling hydroponic systems for horticulture, and those devoted to cannabis cultivation.

== History ==
In the 1950s, marijuana became very popular amongst the college community of the United States and in the following decade grow shops were established to provide cannabis cultivation related products. Starting in the 1980s in Europe, with the proliferation of legal cannabis cultivation enthusiasts by home growers across several countries, like The Netherlands and later in Spain, a nearly new business was born in order to supply those market and the term "grow shop" was also adopted by them to refer to shops which sell cannabis cultivation products, including cannabis seeds. Grow shop is another terminology for stores which exclusively sell hydroponics systems and products.

== Products and supplies ==
In a grow shop there are products for indoor growing of plants, including: lamps/light bulbs, ventilation fans, pollinators, pots, fertilizers, and many other products for indoor and outdoor growing. Typically, grow shops or hydroponic stores do not sell drug paraphernalia or anything relating to drugs like cannabis seeds. Some grow shops may sell books on cannabis cultivation. In a broad sense, the designation "grow shop" may refer to any shop which sells the equipment and supplies to grow indoors; this may range from hydroponic cultivation of vegetables to cannabis cultivation. The latter supplies (though with less variety than at a grow shop) may also be sold at a head shop, a counterculture retail store that sells drug paraphernalia and drug-related clothes and decorating items.

== See also ==
- Growroom
