= Growroom =

Room for growing plants under controlled conditions

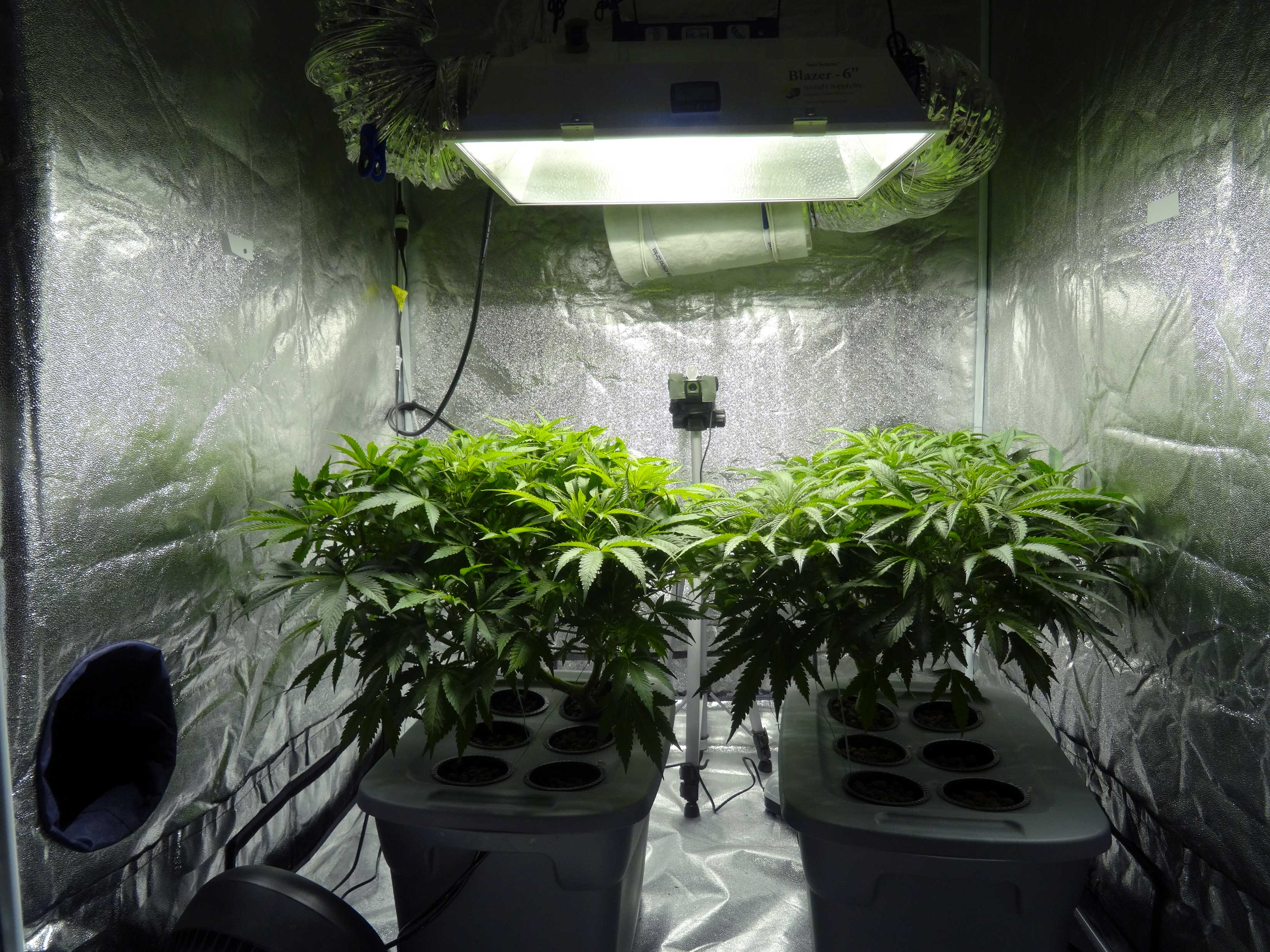
Two cannabis plants in a growroom

A growroom (or grow room) or growth chamber is a room of any size where plants are grown under controlled conditions. The reasons for utilizing a growroom are countless. Some seek to avoid the criminal repercussions of growing illicit cultivars, while others simply have no alternative to indoor growing. Plants can be grown with the use of grow lights, sunlight, or a combination of the two. Due to the heat generated by high power lamps, grow rooms will often become excessively hot relative to the temperature range ideal for plant growth, often necessitating the use of a supplemental ventilation fan.

== Growing methods ==
The plants in a growroom can be grown in soil, or without soil via means such as hydroponics, and aeroponics. Vermiculite, perlite, coconut husk and rockwool are common components in soilless mixes for indoor cultivation.

== Lighting ==
LED grow lights in an indoor hemp farm in Orlová, Czech Republic (2021)

The three most common varieties of artificial lighting for indoor growing are high-intensity discharge lamps (the most prevalent for this application being: sodium-vapor lamps for flowering and metal halide lamps for growing), compact fluorescent lamps, and traditional fluorescent lamps. Full spectrum indoor LED grow lights are becoming more common in grow rooms due to their low energy requirements and very low heat output.

=== Luminous efficacy ===
Light is the essential "plant food"; everything else provided in cultivating a plant serves the purpose of helping it absorb and use the light. As the plant grows larger, it requires an increasing amount of light. There is no substitute for light: if the amount of light received by the plant is insufficient, the plant will stretch, and / or growth will slow to a halt.

For indoor gardening, one of the most important requirements is the amount of light energy striking the surface of the plant ("incident light"), which can be measured in lux (lux = lumens / area illuminated in square metres). For indoor use, higher lighting efficiency produces more lumens per unit of area with less power and less waste heat.

LED grow lights use very low power and are usually engineered to produce monochromatic light matching the highest absorption wavelengths of plant photosynthetic reactions. This design optimizes photosynthesis for a given quantity of input power, as opposed to fluorescent lights which only provide a portion of the desirable spectrum or incandescent and gas-discharge bulbs which also produce only a portion of the optimal wavelengths and, in addition, waste significant energy in the form of heat.

Light-emitting diode (LED) lamps have replaced high-intensity discharge lamps (HID) as the most efficient devices in terms of Lumen (unit)s of light output per unit of power input, but are not yet as widely used. Continuing improvements in lifetime cost per lumen, long life power supplies, and banked or multi-LED fixtures are making LED lights more suitable for large-scale plant lighting.

Compact fluorescent lamps are less efficient than LED or HID lamps, but run relatively cool and are widely available in simple fixtures and therefore continue to be used. Traditional fluorescent lamps generally do not produce enough concentrated light to be a primary light source for most indoor growing operations. Fluorescent and compact fluorescent lamps are excellent light sources for young plants (seedlings). They are also used to supplement the light generated by primary HID lamps.

== Ventilation ==
As a controlled environment, grow rooms offer many advantages over outdoor alternatives. However, without adequate ventilation, the plants may consume resources, like oxygen and carbon dioxide, faster than they can be replenished. Adequate gas exchange is necessary for optimal plant growth. Ventilation is also an important method for maintaining an optimal temperature for plant growth. Advanced grow room even include air conditioning to keep running temperatures down, as well as CO_{2} to boost the plant's growth rate.

== Clandestine usage ==
Cultivating marijuana is illegal in many countries, and thus some choose to grow marijuana indoors in an attempt to conceal their activities.

Law enforcement authorities attempting to locate grow rooms are known to search the records of electricity providers for signs of excessive electrical consumption and employ air or ground vehicles using thermal imaging cameras/FLIR/(infrared cameras) to detect unusual instances of excess heat radiating or otherwise escaping from buildings.

Growers respond to the use of thermal imaging cameras by isolating and decoupling rooms physically from the outer walls of buildings, and directing ventilation exhaust into a chimney.

== See also ==
- Aeroponics
- Dark photosynthesis
- Hydroponics
- Fogponics
- Grow box
- Grow shop
- Water chiller
- Hydroponic dosers
