= Growbag =

Planter filled with growing medium used for growing plants

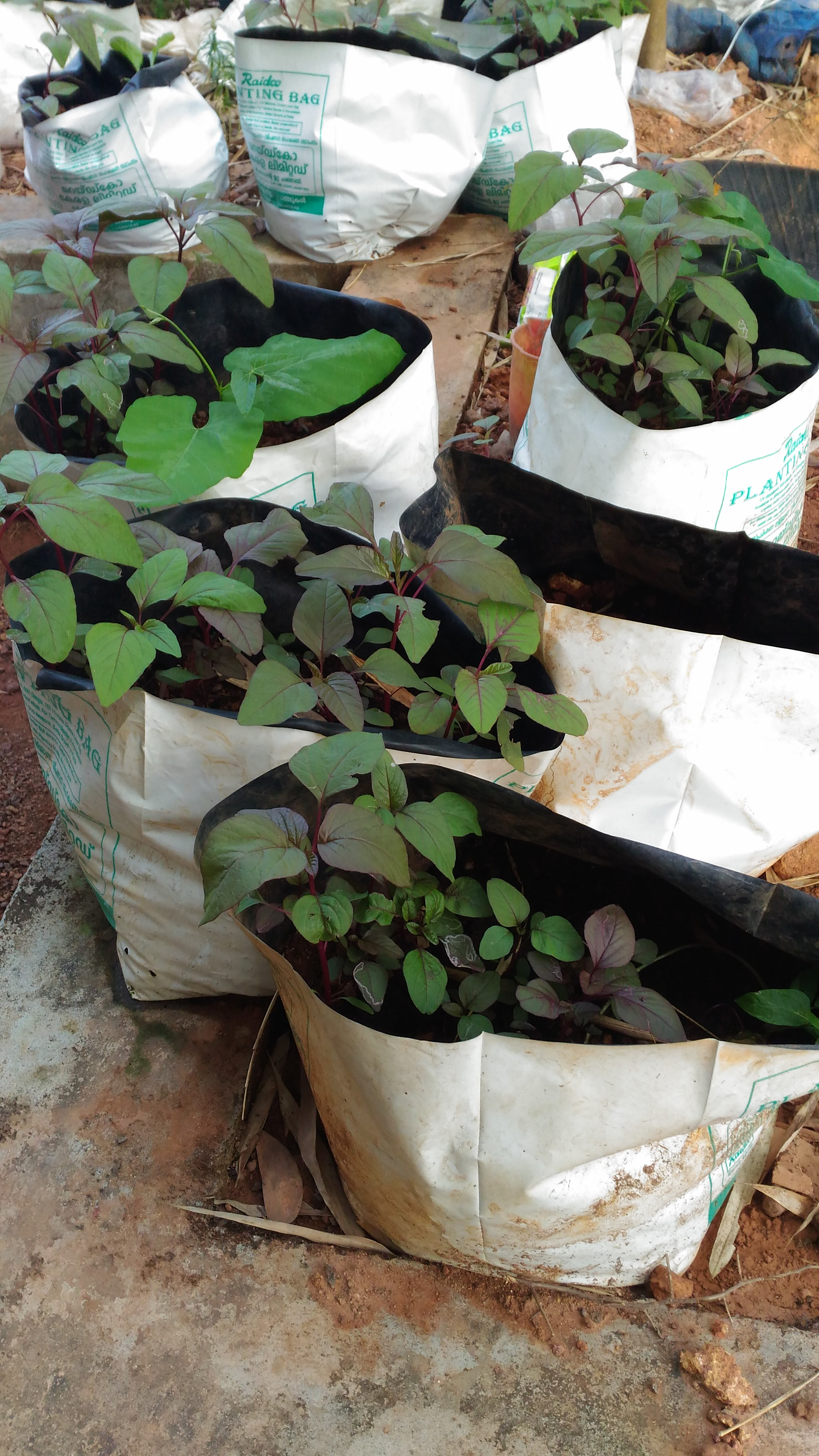
Plants in growbags

A growbag is a planter filled with a growing medium and used for growing plants, usually tomatoes or other salad crops. Originally made of plastic, modern bags are also made from jute or fabric. The growing medium is usually based on a soilless organic material such as peat, coir, composted green waste, composted bark or composted wood chips, or a mixture of these. Various nutrients are added, sufficient for one season's growing, so frequently only planting and watering are required of the end-user. Planting is undertaken by first laying the bag flat on the floor or bench of the growing area, then cutting access holes in the uppermost surface, into which the plants are inserted.

Growbags were first produced in the 1970s for home use, but their use has since spread into market gardening and farming. They come in different sizes and formulations suited to specific crops.

Prior to the introduction of growbags, greenhouse soil had to be replaced or sterilized each season between crops to prevent a buildup of pests and diseases in the ground. Commercial growers could steam sterilize their ground, but this was not feasible for the amateur grower so growbags were introduced. At the end of the season the plants are disposed of and the compost spread over outdoor borders. The bags should not be reused.

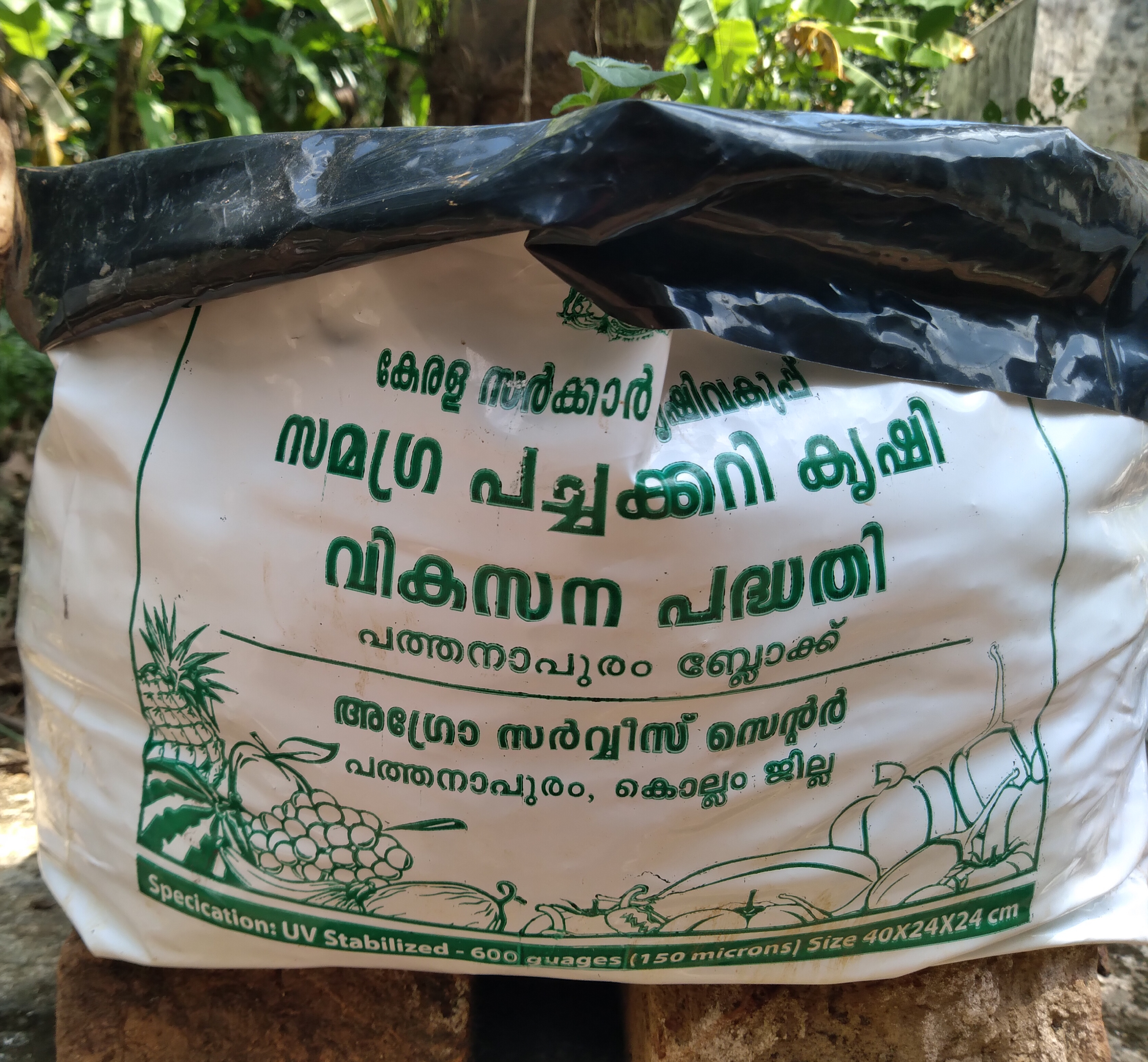
Growbag distributed by Department of Agriculture Development & Farmers' Welfare as a part of vegetable development programme in Kerala, India

== See also ==
- Grow box
- Pot farming
