= Grow box =

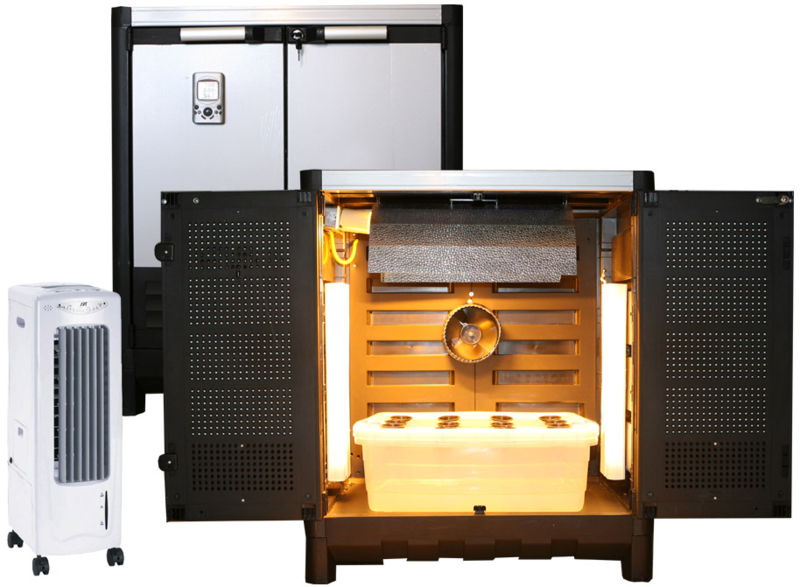
An example of a stealth, hydroponic, and an industrial-made grow box

A grow box is a partially or completely enclosed system for raising plants indoors or in small areas. Grow boxes are used for a number of reasons, including the lack of available outdoor space or the desire to grow vegetables, herbs or flowers during cold weather months. They can also help protect plants against pests or diseases.

Grow boxes may be soil-based or hydroponic. The most sophisticated examples are totally enclosed, and contain a built-in grow light, intake and exhaust fan system for ventilation, a hydroponics system that waters the plants with nutrient-rich solution, and an odor control filter. Some advanced grow box units even include air conditioning to keep running temperatures down, as well as CO_{2} to boost the plant's growth rate. These advanced elements allow the gardener to maintain optimal temperature, light patterns, nutrition levels, and other conditions for the chosen plants.

Key growlight options include fluorescent bulbs, which offer relatively limited light output; high-intensity discharge lamps such as sodium-vapor lamps and metal-halide lamps; and light-emitting diodes bulbs, which are becoming more energy-efficient.

In different sizes and degrees of complexity, grow boxes are also referred to as grow cabinets and lightproof cabinets. A full-room version of a grow box is a growroom.

== Components ==
Grow cabinets have many different pieces of equipment that improve plant growth and yields. The system usually allows its owner to control all conditions inside the cabinet to make them perfect for growth. Below is a chart of different pieces of equipment in many commercially-built cabinets.

Equipment	Effect	Types
Carbon filter	Actively filters/cleans the air and prevents smells from escaping into areas around the grow.	Cylinder filters in different heights and diameters.
Lighting systems	Allow for control of seasons, increased energy up take, etc. over sun light.	CFL (Compact Fluorescent Light), HID (High Intensity Discharge), LED
Hydroponic systems	Growing plants in nutrient solution allows for increased nutrient uptake with better yields and growth rates over soil growing	Deep water culture, aeroponics, drip irrigation, ebb & flow systems, floater systems, and wick systems
Ventilation	Allows for circulation of air to control humidity and temperature conditions.	Includes: Induct fan, rotating fan, light hood cooling fan
Carbon dioxide systems	Allow for control of CO_{2} levels to improve photosynthesis rates	Includes: Cans that slowly release it and are completely disposable. Tank systems that slowly release CO_{2} from a tank at a set rate.
Water filtering system	Allow for filtering of nutrient solution to remove particles that are harmful for plants or could damage the hydroponic system.	Many different types from inline filters to filtering systems placed in nutrient solution.

== See also ==
- Aeroponics
- Growbag
- Growroom
- Ultrasonic Hydroponic Fogger
- Hydroponic dosers
- Hydroponics
- Pot farming
