= Anthroponics =

Hydroponic use of human waste in plant cultivation

Anthroponics is a type of hydroponics system that uses human waste like urine as the source of nutrients for the cultivated plants. In general, the human urine or mixed waste is collected and stored for a period of time, before being applied either directly or passed through a biofilter before reaching the plants. As a form of organic hydroponics, anthroponics combines elements of both hydroponics and aquaponics systems.

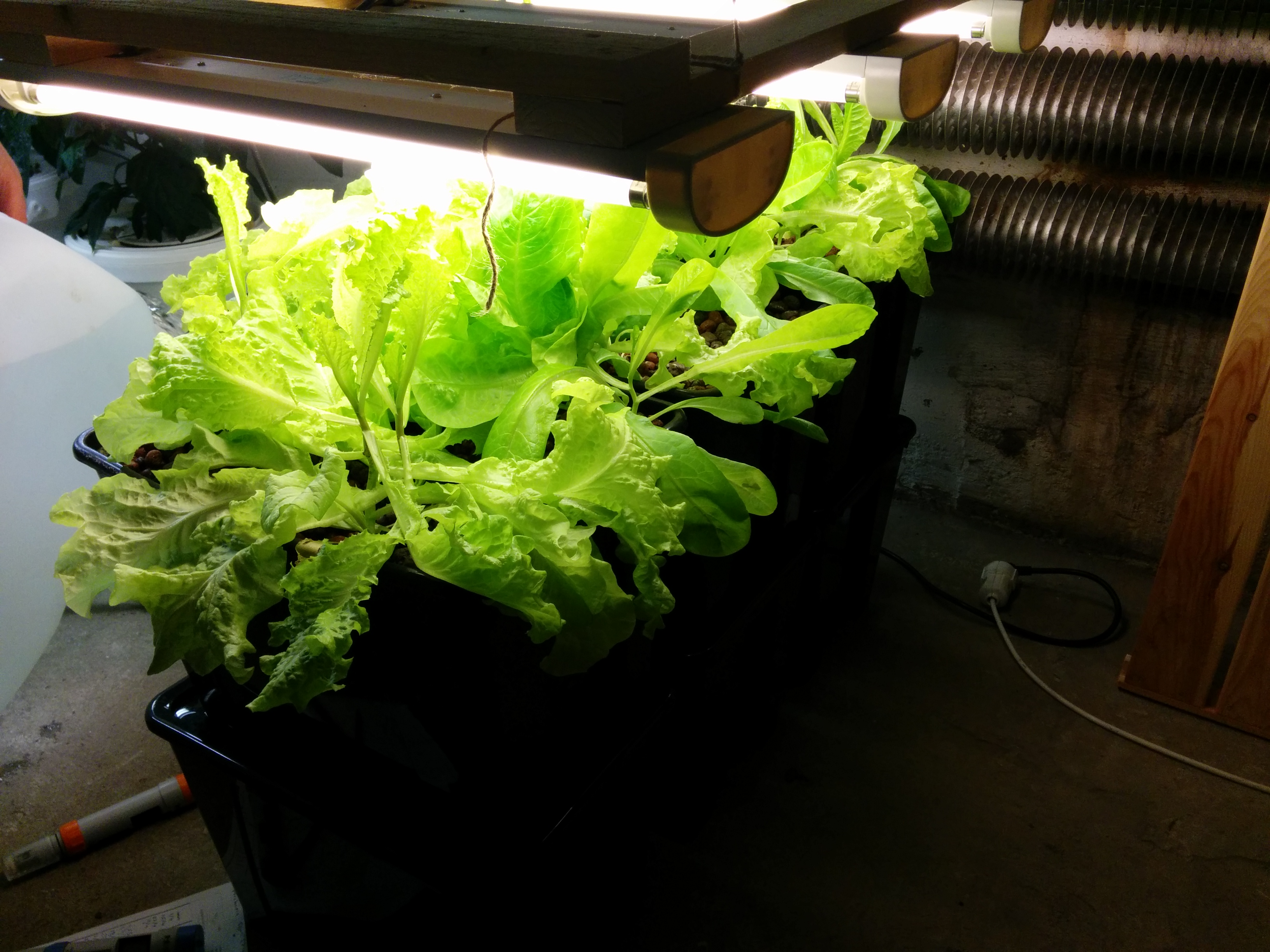
Lettuce (Lactuca sativa) grown in three similar anthroponic systems

== History ==
While human waste has historically been used as a fertilizer, its use in soilless systems is a recent field of research. The earliest published research on the topic is in 1991 by researcher Guterstam, B., in which the treatment of domestic wastewater by an aquaculture and hydroponic mesocosm is described.

Since then, other researchers have explored both human mixed waste and human urine as nutrient sources for hydroponic cultivation, studying the potential of such waste, comparisons to traditional fertilizers, both in the context of wastewater treatment, agriculture, and even space exploration.

== Urine as a fertilizer ==
Urine is 91-96% water, with urea constituting the largest amount of solids, and the rest being inorganic salts and organic compounds, including proteins, hormones, and a wide range of metabolites

The urea in urine naturally converts into ammonia through a process known as ammonia volatilization from urea. This process, which can take between 5 weeks to 6 months, increases the pH of the liquid to 9, thus sterilizing it. The time it takes for this process to occur can be drastically reduced to hours or minutes through the addition of the urease enzyme, which can be synthesized or found in watermelon seeds. The sterilized and volatilized liquid is then passed through a biofilter where nitrifying bacteria convert the ammonia to nitrate, a more plant available form of nitrogen.

It has been experimentally shown that on average 0.47mL of human urine can grow 1 gram of lettuce, therefore given that on average an adult human produces around 1.4 litres of urine in just one day, it is estimated that one human adult could produce almost 3 kg of lettuce from the volume of urine excreted in just one day. Wood ash has also been used to supplement urine when cultivating cucumbers, as they require more nutrients than those found in urine.

== Hydroponic subsystem ==
After the biofilter, the water is transported to the hydroponic component where the plants are located, and where they will absorb the nutrients, cleaning the water before it returns to the biofilter. Almost all techniques used in hydroponics and aquaponics are also applicable to anthroponics. These include: Deep water culture, Nutrient film technique, and Media beds.

== Advantages ==
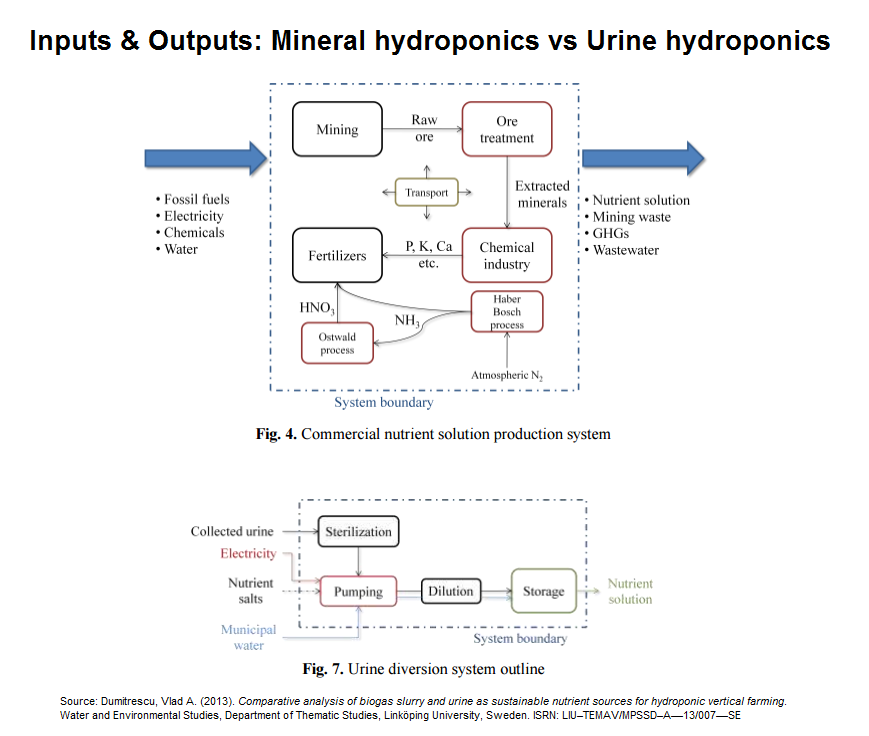
Image describing the inputs and outputs of a mineral soiless cultivation (hydroponics) and a urine based soiless cultivation (anthroponics)

Urine based solutions in hydroponics research seem to have been developed out of sustainability concerns with current mineral based hydroponic solutions. Mineral based commercial nutrient solutions are resource intensive and energy demanding, while also producing a lot of waste. The activities involved in its production include: mining, ore treatment, chemical processing, and transportation, which result in the required nutrients for the final solution. The whole process requires fossil fuels, electricity, chemicals, and water, while producing the nutrient solution, but also mining waste, greenhouse gases, and wastewater. By comparison, using urine as the nutrient source requires the collection of urine, electricity, some nutrient salts, and water, while producing no waste, limited greenhouse gases, and the final nutrient solution.

== Disadvantages ==
Some disadvantages concerning the use of urine as the nutrient source in an hydroponics system include strict laws concerning the use of human waste in food crops, the unpleasant handling and odors produced by human urine, and the release of persistent organic pollutants and trace metals in human urine.
