= Hydroponic dosers =

Hydroponic dosers are used by indoor, hydroponic farmers to automate the task of dispensing pH solution and/or nutrient solution as necessary.

When growing in hydroponics, the pH of the nutrient solution often drifts off target during use. The same is said for the amount of nutrients in the solution. These devices will automatically measure and adjust the solution as needed. By keeping TDS and pH levels in-range, plants grow efficiently, without health problems. Hydroponic dosers are generally specific for adjusting TDS or pH.
