= Goward =

Goward may refer to:

== Geography ==
- Goward Peak, Palmer Land, Antarctica
- Temagami North, Ontario, Canada, an unincorporated community formerly called Goward
- Goward Dolmen, Northern Ireland, a dolmen (megalithic tomb)

== People ==
- Ernest Goward (1896–1961), Indian cricketer
- Frank Kenneth Goward (1919–1954), English physicist
- Mary Anne Keeley (1805–1899), née Goward, English actress and actor-manager
- Pru Goward (born 1952), Australian politician
- Russell Goward (1935–2007), American politician
- Ryan Goward (born 1989), English footballer
- Trevor Goward (born 1952), Canadian lichenologist and environmentalist
