= Kratky =

Kratky is an Anglicized and Germanized version of the Czech surname Krátký (Czech feminine: Krátká) and Slovak surname Krátky (Slovak feminine: Krátka). The word means 'short' in Czech and Slovak languages respectively.

Notable people with the surname include:

- Andreas Kratky, German media artist
- Břetislav Krátký (1911–1987), Czech sprinter
- Fred Kratky (born 1942), American politician
- Marek Krátký (born 1993), Czech footballer
- Michele Kratky (born 1957), American politician
- Otto Kratky (1902–1995), Austrian physicist
- Petr Krátký (born 1981), Czech football manager and player

== See also ==
- Kratky method
