= Donna Baringer =

American politician

St. Louis City Comptroller
- Incumbent
- Assumed office April 15, 2025
- Preceded by: Darlene Green

Member of the Missouri House of Representatives from the 82nd district
- In office January 4, 2017 – January 8, 2025
- Preceded by: Michele Kratky
- Succeeded by: Nick Kimble

Member of the St. Louis Board of Aldermen from the 16th ward
- In office April 22, 2003 – January 4, 2017
- Preceded by: James F. Shrewsbury
- Succeeded by: Tom Oldenburg

Personal details
- Born: February 1, 1963 (age 63) St. Louis, Missouri, U.S.
- Party: Democratic

Donna Marie Cunningham Baringer (born February 1, 1963) is an American politician who currently serves as the St. Louis City Comptroller. She served in the Missouri House of Representatives from the 82nd district from 2017 to 2025. She previously served on the St. Louis Board of Aldermen from 2003 to 2017, representing the 16th ward. On April 8, 2025, she was elected Comptroller of St. Louis after defeating Darlene Green, who had served as Comptroller of St. Louis since 1995, in the general election. She was sworn in on April 15, 2025.

== Personal life ==
Baringer is married and has two sons.

== Electoral history ==
Missouri House of Representatives Election, November 8, 2016, District 82
Party	Candidate	Votes	%	±%
Democratic	Donna Baringer	12,840	70.46%	
Republican	Robert J. Crump	5,382	29.54%	
Total votes		18,222	100.00%	

Missouri House of Representatives Primary Election, August 7, 2018, District 82
Party	Candidate	Votes	%	±%
Democratic	Donna Baringer	6,097	73.72%	
Democratic	Fred Kratky	2,174	26.28%	
Total votes		8,271	100.00%	

Missouri House of Representatives Election, November 6, 2018, District 82
Party	Candidate	Votes	%	±%
Democratic	Donna Baringer	12,818	76.13%	+5.67
Republican	Erik Shelquist	4,018	23.87%	−5.67
Total votes		16,836	100.00%	

Missouri House of Representatives Election, November 3, 2020, District 82
Party	Candidate	Votes	%	±%
Democratic	Donna Baringer	14,702	73.57%	−2.56
Republican	Robert J. Crump	5,283	26.43%	+2.56
Total votes		19,985	100.00%	

Missouri House of Representatives Election, November 8, 2022, District 82
Party	Candidate	Votes	%	±%
Democratic	Donna Baringer	12,964	74.98%	+1.43
Republican	Robert J. Crump	4,326	25.02%	−1.43
Total votes		17,290	100.00%	

=== 2025 St. Louis City Comptroller Election ===
Primary Election, March 4, 2025
Party	Candidate	Votes	%
Nonpartisan	Donna Baringer	16,689	47.71%
Nonpartisan	Darlene Green	16,157	46.19%
Nonpartisan	Celeste Metcalf	8,557	24.46%
Total votes		41,403	(Note: Because the primary election was conducted using approval voting (and voters had the opportunity to mark their approval of more than one candidate), the percentages add up to more than 100 percent.)

General Election, April 8, 2025
Party	Candidate	Votes	%
Nonpartisan	Donna Baringer	25,318	51.50%
Nonpartisan	Darlene Green	23,846	48.50%
Total votes		49,165 (Note: One vote went to write-in candidate Jerome Bauer)	100.00
