= Deep water culture =

Hydroponic method of plant production

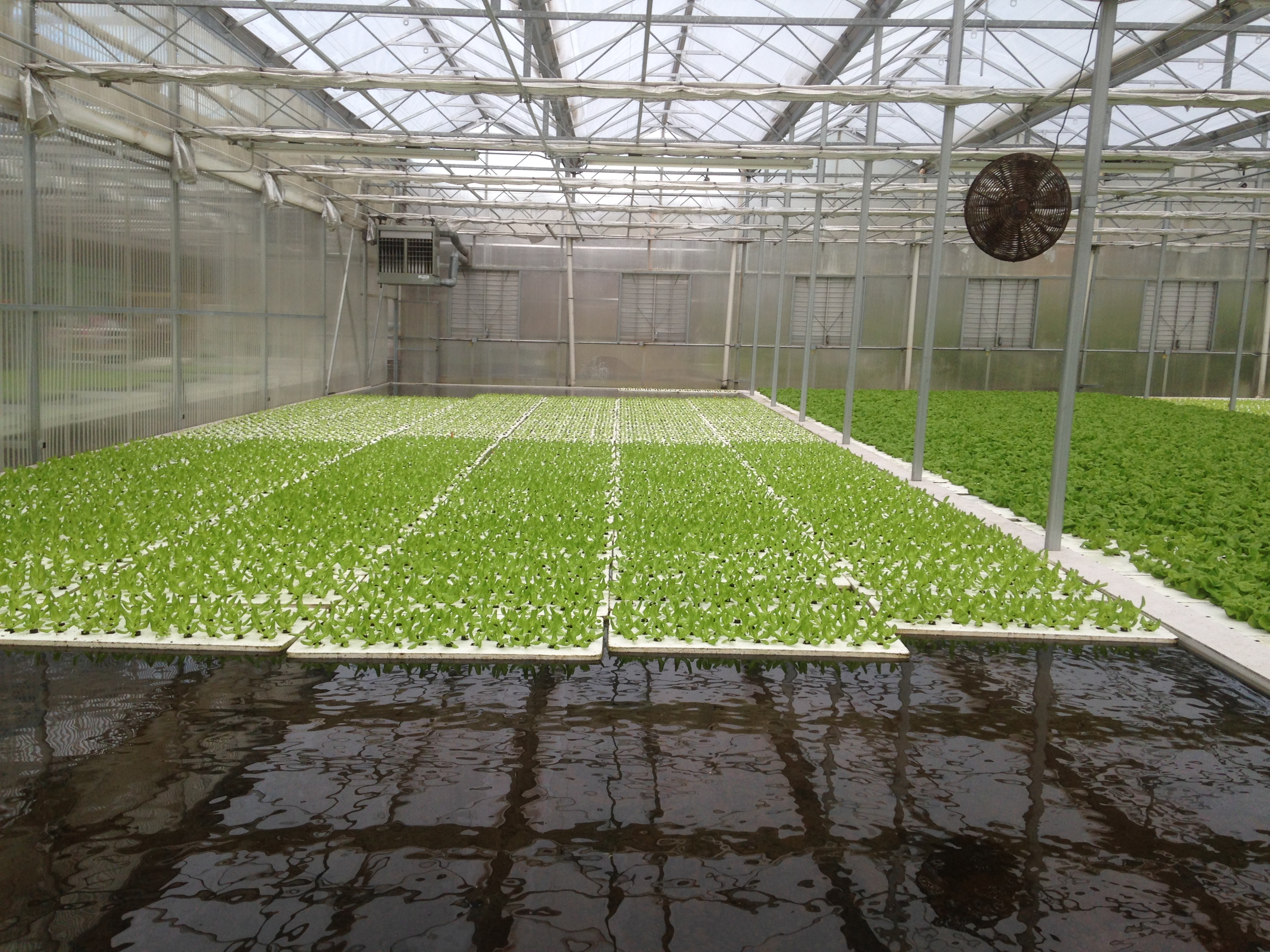
An example of deep water culture in lettuce production.

Deep water culture (DWC) is a hydroponic method of plant production by means of suspending the plant roots in a solution of nutrient-rich, oxygenated water. Also known as deep flow technique (DFT), floating raft technology (FRT), or raceway, this method uses a rectangular tank less than one foot deep filled with a nutrient-rich solution with plants floating in Styrofoam boards on top. This method of floating the boards on the nutrient solution creates a near friction-less conveyor belt of floating rafts. DWC, along with nutrient film technique (NFT), and aggregate culture, is considered to be one of the most common hydroponic systems used today. Typically, DWC is used to grow short-term, non-fruiting crops such as leafy greens and herbs. English physician John Woodward is usually remembered as the first person to grow plants in water culture, although Woodward did note Robert Boyle was conducting similar experiments. Woodward's work was not specifically with DWC systems, however. This system was revised in 2010 to create RDWC. The large volume of water helps mitigate rapid changes in temperature, pH, electrical conductivity (EC), and nutrient solution composition.

== Hobby methods ==
Deep water culture has also been used by hobby growers. Net pots, plastic pots with netting to allow roots to grow through their surface, are filled with a hydroponic medium such as expanded clay aggregate or mineral wool to hold the base of the plant. In some cases net pots are not needed. For oxygenation of the hydroponic solution, an airstone is added. This air stone is then connected to an airline that runs to an air pump.

As the plant grows, the root mass stretches through the mineral wool (e.g. Rockwool) or ECA (e.g. Hydroton) into the water below. Under ideal growing conditions, plants are able to grow a root mass that comprises the entire bin in a loosely packed mass. As the plant grows and consumes nutrients the pH and EC of the water fluctuate. For this reason, frequent monitoring must be kept of the nutrient solution to ensure that it remains in the uptake range of the crop. A pH that is too high or too low will make certain nutrients unavailable for uptake by plants. In terms of EC, too low means that there is a low salt content, usually meaning a lack of fertilizer, and an EC that it too high indicates a salt content that could damage the roots of crops. Desired EC depends on the crop that is growing.

== Plant Growth Requirements in DWC ==
A grower utilizing a DWC system has to modify the environment as to provide the proper conditions for optimal growth. Although this is true for any protected-crop production system, such as greenhouses, indoor systems, or vertical farms; utilizing DWC comes with some specific responsibilities that the grower should heed. Most notably, the plants’ roots are suspended in a nutrient solution, opposed to a growing media. This requires special attention to specific parameters which are described below in more detail (oxygen, temperature, pH and nutrient concentration). As in other methods, soils and soilless media can assist in acting as a buffer for potentially harmful agents like disease or water quality concerns. Since the roots are directly cultured in the nutrient solution, the water quality is of the utmost concern.

Plants require oxygen to carry out the process of root respiration that is imperative for healthy growth, such as the uptake of fertilizer salts. The nutrient solution is oxygenated utilizing the injection of gases via various methods. Most commonly, the nutrient solution is oxygenated using “air stones.” Air stones are made from porous materials that, when air is pushed through, creates bubbles. As the bubbles float to the surface, diffusion occurs, and the surrounding water is oxygenated. Respective of the porosity of the material, these bubbles can vary in size. The smaller the bubbles emitted from the air stone, the greater the surface area of the population of bubbles. This leads to a greater rate of diffusion, and thus “microbubble” stones, for example, are far more efficient than casual aquarium stones.

Another way to inject oxygen into the nutrient solution is by using liquid oxygen (LOx). This method is more common in commercial settings due to the increased initial investment. However, it can be an economical choice for mid to large operations. Here, pure oxygen is compressed within a tank, and when released into the nutrient solution, forces a high rate of diffusion and oxygenation. It is possible to reach post-saturation levels with this method.

Water temperature is an important factor in oxygen retention in the nutrient solution. Water is generally chilled to a temperature between 18 and 24 °C in order to maintain proper dissolved oxygen concentration since oxygenation solubility in water increases as temperature decreases. Chilling the water also helps to prevent pathogens such as pythium, delays bolting, and can increase yield.

Oxygenation can also be achieved by using hydrogen peroxide (H_{2}O_{2}), which serves the dual purpose of also being a sterilizing agent. However, using the appropriate amounts is very important as root damage can easily occur if used in excess. It is not suitable for reaching the amounts of DO needed for optimal plant growth alone.

Other water quality parameters such as pH, alkalinity, and EC are also imperative to control, and are usually controlled with injectors and cultural techniques. Lettuce, for example, grows best in a pH of 5.6–6.0, EC of 1.1–1.4 dS·m^{−1}, 17 mol·m^{−2}·d^{−1} daily light integral which may consist of a combination of natural and supplemental lighting, air temperature of 24 °C day/19 °C night, water temperature of 25 °C, and dissolved oxygen of >7 mg·L^{−3}.

== Recirculating Deep Water Culture ==
Traditional methods using unconnected buckets require each bucket to be tested for pH and conductivity factor (CF) individually. This has led to the creation of Recirculating Deep Water Culture (RDWC) systems. Rather than having individual buckets, RDWC bins are linked together most commonly using a PVC pipe. A pump is also added at the front of the system that pulls water through a line from rear of the system into a control bucket. This return line generally has a spin filter on it that cleans particulate from the water before it reaches the pump. The individual bins, including the control are aerated. The primary disadvantage of RDWC is that disease can spread quickly in these systems which can facilitate the transfer of pathogens from one reservoir to another.

== Commercial deep water culture ==
Commercially, DWC systems usually appear in the form of FRT systems. FRT systems utilize floating rafts in ponds that allow for the roots of the plants to be suspended in a nutrient (fertilizer) solution. Commercial systems are typically constructed in greenhouses, though they can be installed outdoors, under other forms of protection, or completely indoors. Most commercial DWC systems are designed to grow leafy greens such as head lettuce, baby leaf greens, large leaf greens, and herbs. One may also find facilities that utilize DWC to grow hemp and other produce, however, this is less common.

Depending on what type of produce is being grown, the system design and horticultural techniques will change. For head lettuce and other large-leaf greens, seedlings are typically germinated in soilless media cells (such as rockwool or coconut coir) and then transplanted into the floating rafts, which are usually made from low-density plastics such as food-grade polystyrene. For baby leaf lettuce, seeds are often sown and germinated in higher densities in specialized rafts made to contain soilless media. Some of these rafts will be designed with channels that span the raft, supporting higher density and uniform crops, rather than individual cells, which are best for individual or less dense seed sowing.

Hydroponic growing methods do not inherently grow better produce compared to field crops or crops grown in soil. Rather, it is the directly and more intimately controlled environment that leads to better yields. With proper management, a head of lettuce grown in ideal conditions in soil will grow as well as the same variety grown in a hydroponic system.

One advantage that DWC systems have over other forms of hydroponics is that plants may be re-spaced during the growth period, optimizing the growing area in regard to canopy cover and light-use. At germination and transplantation, the seeds and seedlings are far closer together than later on in their life cycle. For example, in head lettuce production the initial spacing of seedlings can include nine plants per square foot, while the final spacing of adult plants will include 3.5 plants per square foot.

The rafts are generally cleaned after each harvest by scrubbing to remove organic matter and applying bleach or other sanitizing agents to reduce to presence of diseases. In commercial systems, this process is often assisted by automation, where rafts are sent into a machine via conveyor belt, on which they are successively washed, sanitized, and dried.

== See also ==
- Foam
- Kratky method
- Aquaponics
