= Gowar =

Gowar may refer to:

- Gowar Riding, a ward in the Shire of Maldon, Victoria, Australia.
- Ghawar Field, a gigantic oil field in Saudi Arabia.
- Guwar language, also called Gowar, an extinct Australian language

== Goward ==
- Ernest Goward, Indian cricketer
- Pru Goward, Australian politician
- Russell Goward, American politician
- Ryan Goward, English footballer
