= Derio Gambaro =

American politician

Derio L. Gambaro

Member of the Missouri House of Representatives from the 65th district
- In office 1999–2003
- Preceded by: Tom Bauer
- Succeeded by: Fred Kratky

Personal details
- Born: December 6, 1955 (age 70) St. Louis, Missouri, U.S.
- Party: Democratic
- Education: St. Louis University (BA)
- Alma mater: United States Air Force Academy
- Occupation: Politician

Derio L. Gambaro (born December 6, 1955) is an American politician. He previously served in the Missouri House of Representatives where he represented a portion of South St. Louis including The Hill and Dogtown neighborhoods. He is a Democrat.

== Early life and education ==
Gambaro grew up in St. Louis and graduated from St. Louis University High School. He attended the United States Air Force Academy for two years and graduated from St. Louis University in 1979.

== Missouri House of Representatives ==
In 1998, Gambaro was elected State Representative, defeating incumbent Tom Bauer in the Democratic primary election. Gambaro was re-elected in 2000 and did not seek re-election in 2002. He later served on the St. Louis board of election commissioners.

== 2006 State Senate campaign ==
In 2006, after several years out of elective office, Gambaro was an unsuccessful candidate for the 4th District Missouri State Senate seat being vacated by Pat Dougherty. The Democratic primary election was heavily contested, and no Republicans or third party candidates sought the seat. Gambaro finished third in the race, behind political science instructor Jeff Smith and State Representative Yaphett El-Amin, but ahead of State Representative Amber Boykins, and former St. Louis Alderman Kenny Jones .

== State Board of Education ==
Governor Blunt appointed Gambaro to the Missouri State Board of Education in June 2007.

Preceded by Tom Bauer	Missouri State Representative - District 65; 1999– 2003	Succeeded by Fred Kratky
