= Amber Boykins =

American politician

Amber "Holly" Boykins (born April 4, 1969) is an American politician. She represented a portion of North St. Louis in the Missouri House of Representatives. She is a Democrat

Boykins is a St. Louis native. She graduated from Cardinal Ritter College Preparatory High School in 1987 and from Columbia College in 1991. She is currently pursuing both an MBA and a JD.

Boykins was elected State Representative in 1998 in a closely contested Democratic primary election and was elected without opposition in the general election . She was re-elected in 2000, 2002, and 2004.

Due to term limits Boykins was unable to seek re-election in 2006. She announced her candidacy for the 4th District State Senate seat being vacated by Pat Dougherty. Other announced candidates were fellow State Representative Yaphett El-Amin, former State Representative Derio Gambaro, former St. Louis Alderman Kenny Jones, and political science professor Jeff Smith. The primary election was held on August 8, 2006, and was won by Jeff Smith, who was unopposed in the general election.
