= Tony Ribaudo =

American politician (1941–2020)

Member of the Missouri House of Representatives from the 65th district
- In office January 5, 1983 – January 8, 1997
- Preceded by: Russell Goward
- Succeeded by: Tom Bauer

Member of the Missouri House of Representatives from the 87th district
- In office January 5, 1977 – January 5, 1983
- Preceded by: John E. Scott
- Succeeded by: Sue Shear

Personal details
- Born: November 21, 1941 St. Louis, Missouri
- Died: March 23, 2020 (aged 78) Chesterfield, Missouri
- Party: Democratic

Anthony D. Ribaudo (November 21, 1941 – March 23, 2020) was an American politician from Missouri, of the Democratic Party. Ribaudo was born and raised in St. Louis and attended Washington University. In 1993, Ribaudo was an unsuccessful candidate for mayor of St. Louis. He finished third in the Democratic primary election behind Freeman Bosley Jr. and Tom Villa. After narrowly winning his re-election campaign in 1994, Ribaudo did not seek re-election in 1996. In 1976, he was elected to the Missouri House of Representatives representing the Hill neighborhood. Ribaudo was re-elected nine times and served part of the time as house majority leader. In 1989 he challenged Bob F. Griffin for Speaker of the House. After losing Griffin assigned him to a windowless office.

He died of lung cancer on March 23, 2020, in Chesterfield, Missouri, at age 78.
