= Sue Shear =

American politician

Member of the Missouri House of Representatives from the 83rd district
- In office January 6, 1993 – November 15, 1998
- Preceded by: Patrick J. Hickey
- Succeeded by: Barbara Fraser

Member of the Missouri House of Representatives from the 87th district
- In office January 5, 1983 – January 6, 1993
- Preceded by: Tony Ribaudo
- Succeeded by: Raymond Hand

Member of the Missouri House of Representatives from the 76th district
- In office January 3, 1973 – January 5, 1983
- Preceded by: Russell Goward
- Succeeded by: Judith G. O'Connor

Personal details
- Born: March 17, 1918 Glen Carbon, Illinois
- Died: November 15, 1998 (aged 80) Clayton, Missouri
- Party: Democratic
- Spouse(s): Harry D. Shear, married November 5, 1939
- Children: 3
- Education: Washington University in St. Louis
- Occupation: politician
- Profession: homemaker

Sue Shear (March 17, 1918 – November 15, 1998) was an American politician who served in the Missouri House of Representatives from 1973 to 1998. She was educated at the University City High School and at Washington University in St. Louis.

She died of cancer on November 15, 1998, in Clayton, Missouri at age 80.
