= Dan Stowers Office Building =

- Dan Stowers Building
- U.S. National Register of Historic Places
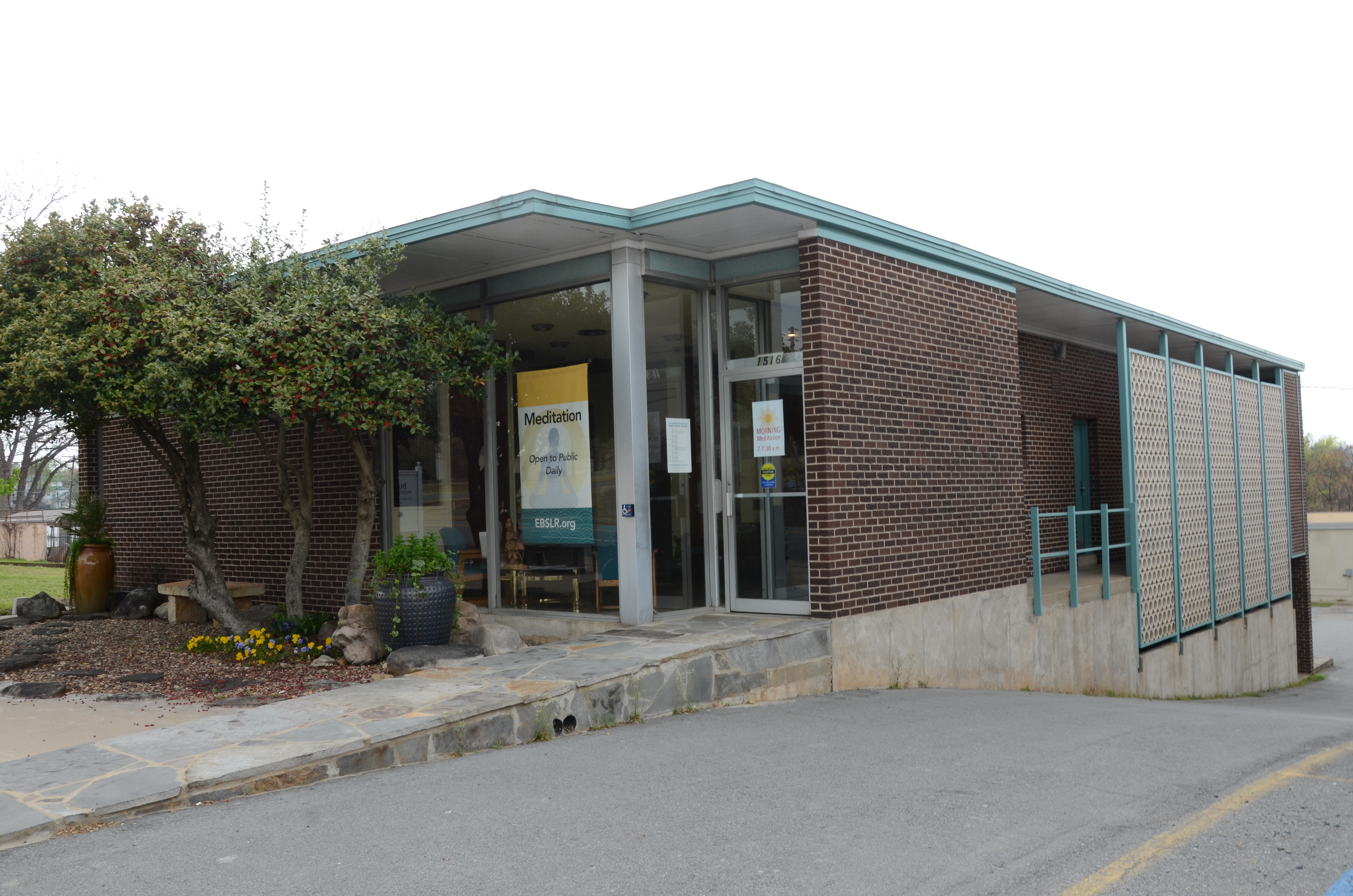

- Location within Arkansas Location within the United States
- Location: 1516 W. 3rd St., Little Rock, Arkansas
- Coordinates: 34°44′55″N 92°17′18″W
- Area: less than one acre
- Built: 1961
- NRHP reference No.: 15000633
- Added to NRHP: September 28, 2015

The Dan Stowers Office Building is a historic commercial building at 1516 West 3rd Street in Little Rock, Arkansas. It is a single-story masonry structure, with an International style design by architect Dan Stowers, Sr. It was built in 1961, and served as the office of Stowers and his son, Dan Jr., until 2013. The building is notable for its Mid-Century Modern design, featuring curtain-wall windows, porcelain enamel panels, and blocks of haydite in its construction.

The building was listed on the National Register of Historic Places in 2015.

== See also ==
- National Register of Historic Places listings in Little Rock, Arkansas
