= Passive hydroponics =

Method of growing plants

Passive hydroponics, semi-hydroponics or passive subirrigation is a method of growing plants without soil, peat moss, or bark.

== Methods ==
Instead an inert porous medium transports water and fertilizer to the roots by capillary action. Water and fertilizer are held in a reservoir and conducted to the roots as necessary, reducing labor and providing a constant supply of water to the roots. In the simplest method, the pot sits in a shallow solution of fertilizer and water or on a capillary mat saturated with nutrient solution. Since routine maintenance is much simplified, passive hydroponics can reduce the labor required to maintain a large collection of plants.

=== Semi-Hydroponics ===
Semi-Hydroponics (Semi-Hydro or S/H) was the first passive hydroponic technique utilized for orchids, originating in the early 1990s, using Lightweight Expanded Clay Aggregate (LECA) as a medium in solid-bottomed containers, into which one or two, small-diameter holes were placed in the sidewall, setting the depth of the internal reservoir. Alternatively, standard pots with bottom drainage may be placed in a tray, creating an external reservoir.

=== Kratky method ===
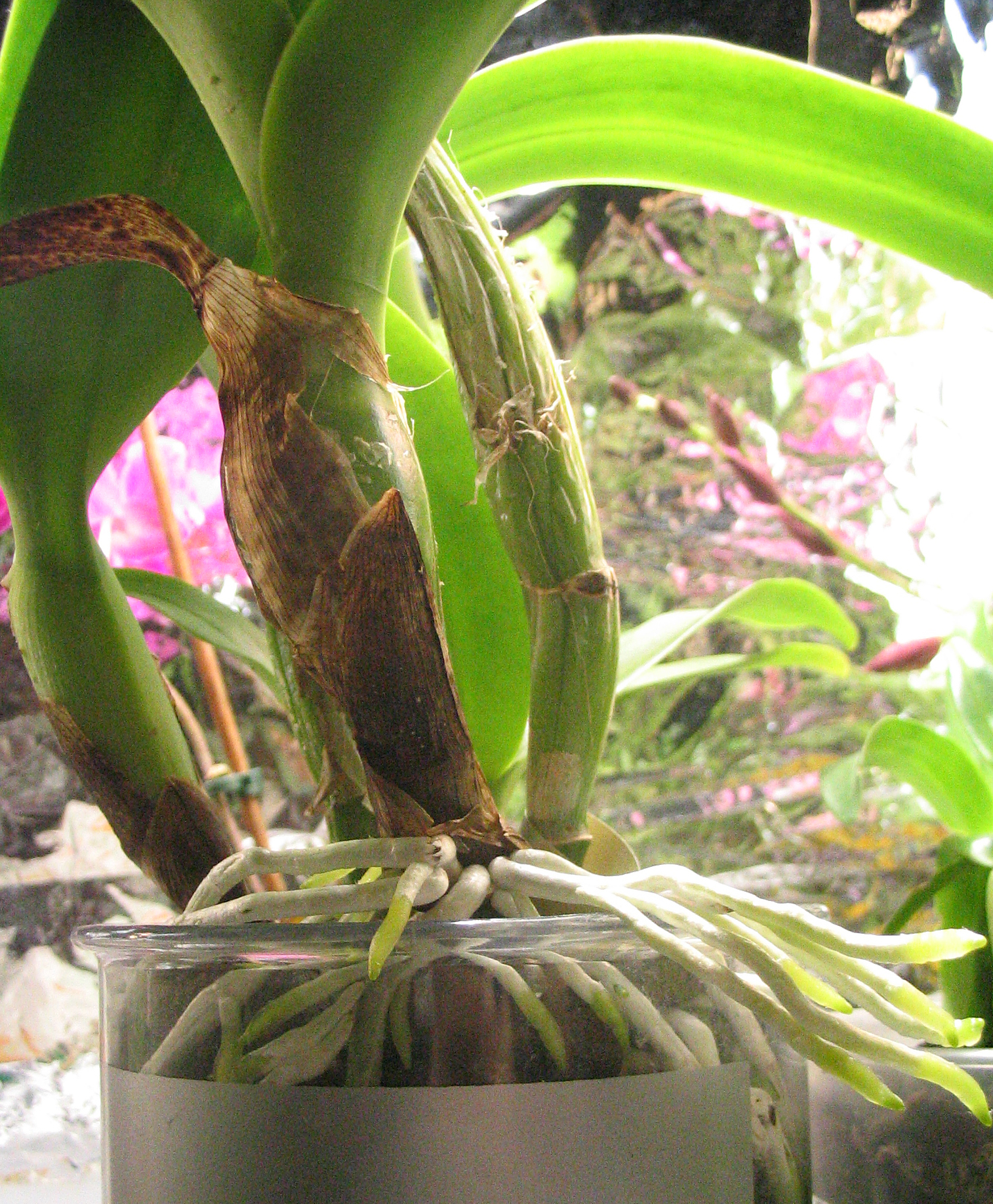
Cattleya transferred to passive hydroponics culture 5 weeks earlier. Rich development of surface roots.

The Kratky Method is a specialized passive hydroponic technique which involves plants suspended in net pots above a non-circulating water and nutrient reservoir.

The various hydroponic media available contain more air space than more traditional potting mixes, delivering increased oxygen to the roots. Allowing air to reach the roots is particularly important in preventing root rot in epiphytic plants such as orchids and bromeliads, whose roots are exposed to the air in nature. Passive hydroponics also may add additional ambient humidity through evaporation. It is important in passive subirrigation to wash out the system from time to time to remove salt accumulation. Some feel that plants that require drying between waterings or a dry dormant period may fail to thrive under the constant moisture of passive hydroponics, while others have found that - once a plant has replaced its existing root system with one that has grown optimized for the environment, their care is greatly simplified.

== Media ==
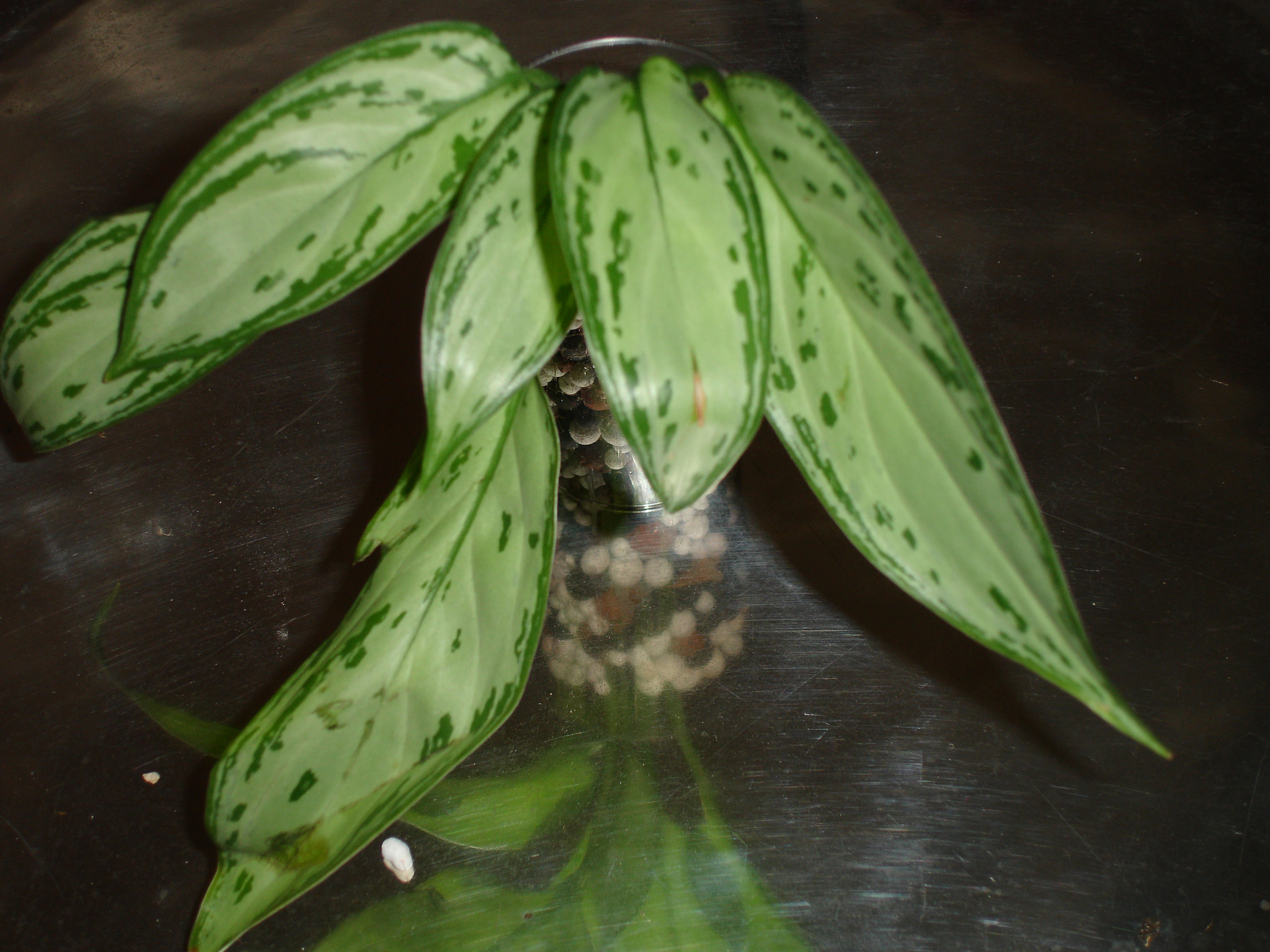
Silver Queen cutting in growing medium

The medium is a key component. It must provide capillary action that will keep the plant uniformly moist. It has to be something that won’t decompose and provides adequate air space. Many media are available for passive hydroponics, but the most common are expanded clay pellets, coconut husk chips, perlite, vermiculite, diatomite, and rock wool. These are frequently used in combination.

== See also ==
- Aeroponics
