= Gambaro =

Gambaro is an Italian surname. Notable people with the surname include:

- Derio Gambaro (born 1955), American politician
- Enzo Gambaro (born 1966), Italian footballer and manager
- Griselda Gambaro (born 1928), Argentine writer
- Teresa Gambaro (born 1958), Australian politician
