= Yaphett El-Amin =

American politician

Personal details
- Born: March 30, 1971 (age 55) St. Louis, Missouri

Yaphett El-Amin (born March 30, 1971) is an American politician who, until 2006, represented a portion of St. Louis in the Missouri House of Representatives. She is a Democrat.

== Early life and education ==
El-Amin is a native of St. Louis. She graduated from the University of Arkansas, Pine Bluff with a BA in political science and is pursuing a master's degree in public administration at Southern Illinois University, Edwardsville.

== Career ==
=== Political positions ===
El-Amin, who is African-American, entered politics in 1997, when she became Democratic Committeewoman for the 1st Ward. In 2002, she was a successful candidate for the Democratic nomination for State Representative in the 57th District. She was elected without opposition in the general election and was re-elected without opposition in 2004.

In 2006, El-Amin was an unsuccessful candidate to replace Pat Dougherty in the Missouri State Senate. She finished second in a heavily contested Democratic primary election behind political science instructor Jeff Smith. Other candidates in the race were fellow state representative Amber Boykins, former State Representative Derio Gambaro, and former St. Louis Alderman Kenny Jones. Her husband Talibdan (TD) El-Amin won a contentious primary to become the Democratic party nominee to replace his wife in the Missouri House of Representatives. He was elected without opposition in the 2006 general election.

=== Development ===
In 2008, El-Amin became the Executive Director of MOKAN Construction and Contractors Assistance Center, a non-profit organization that since 1974 has served as a vital link between minority and women owned firms and the general construction community. She established the MOKAN Educational Institute, a State of Missouri recognized training provider that since 2015, trains and graduates hundreds of minorities and females into apprenticeship construction career opportunities within the St. Louis area.

El-Amin is the President of Efficacy Consulting and Development, a private company that she founded in 2007, that specializes in providing diversity consulting services and real estate development. As a leading diversity consultant El-Amin has worked with numerous public and private entities toward realizing their diversity goals and objectives. After working with the Missouri Housing and Development Commission (MHDC) Administration in 2011, to establish stronger business inclusion initiatives, she expanded Efficacy’s focus to further stabilize communities through the expansion of affordable housing development through the creation of their Emerging Business Initiative program designed to increase the number of minority developers and businesses within the State of Missouri.

In 2015, El-Amin completed the Village at Delmar Place Development in partnership with RISE a non-profit affordable housing development organization located in St. Louis Missouri. Together they built a 40-unit LIHTC townhome and garden home development in the Visitation Neighborhood. She quickly expanded upon her vision to further stabilize other disadvantaged communities in St. Louis with the Finney Place project, 40-single family homes, followed by the Scott Manor Senior homes, a 42-unit mixed-use senior facility with commercial business and community meeting space in partnership with Believer’s Temple Church in St. Louis County. In 2018, El-Amin expanded Efficacy’s footprint to the state of Illinois with the renovation of the historic Broadview Hotel in downtown East St. Louis, which will be converted to the New Broadview, a mixed use senior facility that will feature 110 senior-units and more than 25,000 square feet of community commercial space that will start reconstruction in 2020. El-Amin aims to continue to build upon Efficacy’s mission to work with disadvantaged communities to identify problems, create effective solutions, and enhance neighborhoods one block at a time.
