= Johan Berger Mathiesen =

American physician

- Born: November 13, 1872; Drammen, Sweden-Norway
- Died: January 17, 1923 (aged 50); Eau Claire, Wisconsin, U.S.

Johan Berger Mathiesen (13 November 1872 – 17 January 1923) was a Norwegian-born doctor and surgeon who worked for most of his adult life in Wisconsin, United States.

Mathiesen was born in Drammen, Norway, as the son of Colonel Thomas Mathiesen (1832–1922) and Karen Marie Berger (1849–1914). After finishing his degree in medicine at the university of Kristiania in 1898, he immigrated to America in spring 1900. He settled down in Eau Claire, Wisconsin, and lived there for the remainder of his life except for a period in 1902–1905.

Once in Eau Claire, he teamed up with Norwegian-born doctor and surgeon Hans Christian Midelfart (1865–1937). Mathiesen and Midelfart soon came to be regarded as two of the "leading surgeons" of the American Northwest; they appear to have been among the first doctors in the USA who emphasized the importance of specialization among doctors. From 1908 they worked as surgeons at the then newly-founded Luther Hospital in Eau Claire.

Mathiesen died of pneumonia in January 1923 at the age of 50. His death resulted in large headlines in several Wisconsin newspapers at the time.

== Personal life ==
Mathiesen was married to Norwegian-born Augusta Y. Selmer (1878–1923) in 1903. The couple had four children: Anna Augusta (1904, later wife of engineer Odd Dahl), Erling Selmer (1906), Birgit (1908, mother of sociologist Thomas Mathiesen) and John Thomas (1916). Since both Johan Berger and his wife died within months of each other in 1923, the children became orphans at an early age.
