= Can Mr. Smith Get to Washington Anymore? =

- DVD cover
- Directed by: Frank Popper
- Written by: Frank Popper; Matt Coen; Mike Kime
- Produced by: Frank Popper; Matt Coen; Mike Kime
- Starring: Jeff Smith
- Release dates: June 16, 2006 (Silverdocs Film Festival); February 7, 2007 (United States)
- Running time: 82 minutes
- Country: United States
- Language: English

Can Mr. Smith Get to Washington Anymore? is a 2006 documentary film directed by Frank Popper, which follows Missouri politician Jeff Smith's 2004 Democratic primary election campaign to the United States House of Representatives after the retirement of Dick Gephardt from his seat. The film follows Smith as he challenges Russ Carnahan, a member of the Carnahan political family and the frontrunner of a crowded Democratic primary, to capture the Democratic nomination for the seat. The movie's title references Frank Capra's 1939 film Mr. Smith Goes to Washington, in which a naive but well-meaning man (named "Jefferson Smith") becomes a Senator and fights the cynical nature of Washington.

== Synopsis ==
The film follows Jeff Smith from inside his campaign during his bid to win the Democratic primary for the House seat of Representative Dick Gephardt, who announced his retirement. Smith, a 29-year-old teacher with no political experience, decided to run for the seat against 10 other Democratic candidates including Russ Carnahan, a member of the Carnahan political family. He was instantly dismissed by pundits who saw him as a no-name candidate due to his lack of political expertise and the presence of a Carnahan in the race.

Smith's campaign begins to gain more support as he mobilizes a large grassroots political campaign. He earns the endorsement of Howard Dean at one of his speaking events, and his campaign cuts into Carnahan's initial 30-point lead. Smith, however, loses the campaign by fewer than 2,000 votes.

== Critical reception ==
Can Mr. Smith Get to Washington Anymore? earned mostly positive reviews from critics; it received an 83% based on 12 reviews at Rotten Tomatoes, and the film won the Audience Award at the 2006 Silverdocs Documentary Festival.

The Washington Post's Ann Horaday felt that it was a, "funny, engrossing and affectionate documentary." The Boston Globe's Janice Page noted that the movie restored the viewer's faith in democracy, even if Jeff Smith failed to win the seat. Kevin Crust of the Los Angeles Times praised the movie: "... [the film] captures ground-level political machinations in an utterly fascinating way."

== Scandal ==
In August 2009, Jeff Smith pleaded guilty and was sentenced to a year and a day in prison for his involvement in federal election law violations (committed during the congressional campaign depicted in the film) and the subsequent coverup.
