= Tom Bauer =

American lawyer and politician

Tom Bauer (born March 16, 1946) is an American lawyer and politician from St. Louis, Missouri, who served in the Missouri House of Representatives and on the St. Louis Board of Aldermen. In 2005 he was recalled from his position as alderman after supporting a controversial redevelopment proposal that involved the use of eminent domain to acquire homes to build a gas station. In March 2011, Bauer defeated incumbent 24th Ward alderman Bill Waterhouse in the Democratic primary, but lost to independent candidate Scott Ogilvie in the April general election.

== Education and background ==
Bauer grew up in St. Louis and attended Chaminade College Preparatory School. He attended St. Louis University, graduating in 1969. He received his Juris Doctor from St. Mary's University in San Antonio, Texas, in 1979.

== Early political career ==
Bauer first ran for public office in 1992, seeking election to the Missouri House of Representatives. He challenged fellow Democrat and longtime incumbent Tony Ribaudo. The district included the predominantly Italian Hill neighborhood where Ribaudo lived, as well as Bauer's Dogtown neighborhood. Ribaudo won re-election, beating Bauer by 3,200 votes (4,851 to 1,651).

In 1993, Ribaudo was an unsuccessful candidate for the Democratic nomination for Mayor of St. Louis. A number of negative ads and mailings were run by Ribaudo and his opponents attacking one another. In 1994, Bauer again challenged Ribaudo for his house seat. This time, Ribaudo beat Bauer by only 254 votes (2753 to 2499). Bauer gained notoriety for campaigning in the district with his pet donkey, Scotty. The 1994 campaign was also marked by negative campaigning on both sides. Both candidates purchased advertising on cable television and aired spots attacking the other. This level of advertising was highly unusual for a local election.

In 1996, Ribaudo did not run for re-election and Bauer again ran for the state representative seat. Bauer won the crowded Democratic primary with less than 50% of the vote, and went on to win the general election by a wide margin.

== State representative ==
As a member of the state legislature, Bauer was noted for his support of legislation to preserve neighborhood schools. Bauer advocated a "Student's Bill of Rights" that would have required each district to allow students to attend a K-8 school in their neighborhood. Critics said that this plan would have dismantled middle schools and undermined steps that the St. Louis public schools had made to eliminate historic segregation within the public school system.

In 1998, Bauer sought re-election as state representative. The race was again dominated by the division between Bauer's base of support in the Dogtown neighborhood versus the Hill. Unlike 1996, there was only one candidate from The Hill in this election, Derio Gambaro. Gambaro defeated Bauer in the Democratic primary, 58% to 42%.

== Alderman ==
A few months after his unsuccessful bid for re-election as state representative, Bauer filed to run for a position on the St. Louis Board of Aldermen. As with the state representative seat, the district included both the Hill neighborhood and the Dogtown neighborhood. The longtime incumbent from the Hill neighborhood was not seeking re-election. Two candidates from the Hill filed in the Democratic primary. Bauer was the only candidate from Dogtown. He again won the primary with less than 50% of the vote and won the general election in April 1999.

Shortly after his election as alderman, Bauer had the opportunity to participate in the redistricting of aldermanic ward boundaries required after the 2000 Census. The redistricting resulted in the Hill neighborhood being drawn into a new ward, with Bauer's ward consisting mostly of Dogtown.

In 2001 Bauer made a run for comptroller, one of the many citywide elected positions in St. Louis. He challenged the incumbent, Darlene Green, an African-American woman. As with many political campaigns in St. Louis, the voting broke down along racial lines. Bauer carried most of the predominantly white wards in South St. Louis, while Green won the election based on strong support in predominantly Black North St. Louis and in the racially integrated neighborhoods in the central part of the city.

In 2003, Bauer was re-elected as alderman of the redistricted ward, winning 59% of the vote in the Democratic primary and 71% of the vote in the general election. Although he had been elected to office three times, this marked the first time that Bauer had won a majority of the vote in a primary election. Bauer's pet donkey continued to be a fixture in his campaigns. Scotty had died by the time of the 2003 campaign, and had been replaced by a new donkey, named Dan. Although Dan now accompanied Bauer on campaign stops, a drawing of a donkey labeled "Scotty" continued to be featured on Bauer's campaign signs and billboards.

As alderman, Bauer was a proponent of efforts to bring residential and commercial redevelopment to the neighborhoods in his ward. The community he represented was traditionally working class, and the housing mostly consisted of modest bungalows. However, the neighborhood's central location and proximity to Forest Park began attracting more middle-class and upper-class residents. Developers began demolishing some of the older single family homes and building attached luxury townhouses. Bauer consistently supported this type of development, although it generated some controversy.

== Recall ==
Bauer's support for redevelopment efforts generated significant controversy. Especially controversial was Bauer's occasional support of eminent domain for these projects. Opposition crystallized around a proposal to use eminent domain to acquire and demolish several homes and small businesses for a new gas station and convenience store. Several residents of the neighborhood began circulating petitions to have Bauer recalled from office.

Bauer lashed out at his opponents, filing a lawsuit against several leaders of the recall campaign. The lawsuit, which Bauer's opponents characterized as a strategic lawsuit against public participation (SLAPP) suit, generated further outrage. The opponents were able to gather enough signatures to trigger a recall election. In the aftermath of the Supreme Court's Kelo v. New London decision, eminent domain was one of the most prominent issues. In the recall election on September 20, 2005, 61% voted to remove Bauer from office.

The recall created a vacancy on the Board of Aldermen, and a special election was called to fill the seat. Both the Democratic and Republican parties nominated candidates for the seat. Bauer also collected petition signatures and filed to run as an independent.

The campaign was again marked by negative campaigning. Bauer ran newspaper and cable television advertising attacking his Democratic opponent for failing to pay his property taxes on time, and noting an arrest for failure to pay a traffic ticket. As in his past campaigns, Bauer's pet donkey appeared on his campaign signs, along with the label "Independent Democrat". Since Bauer was not the Democratic nominee, the city's Democratic party, led by chairman Brian Wahby, sued to prevent him from using the term "Democrat" or the Democratic symbol of the donkey in his campaign literature. Approximately a week before the election, a settlement was reached allowing Bauer to continue to use the donkey, but requiring him to remove the word "Democrat" from any of his campaign materials.

The special election was held on December 13, 2005. Bill Waterhouse, the Democratic nominee, was elected with 51% of the vote. Bauer received 26.7%, and the Republican candidate received 22.3%.

Bauer again challenged Waterhouse in the Democratic primary of 2007. In the primary election on March 6, 2007, Waterhouse handily beat Bauer with nearly 58 percent of the vote in a two-way race.

Preceded by Tony Ribaudo	Missouri State Representative - District 65; 1997–1999	Succeeded by Derio Gambaro
Preceded by Bob Ruggeri	St. Louis Alderman - 24th Ward; 1999–2005	Succeeded by Bill Waterhouse
