= Total dissolved solids =

Measurement in environmental chemistry

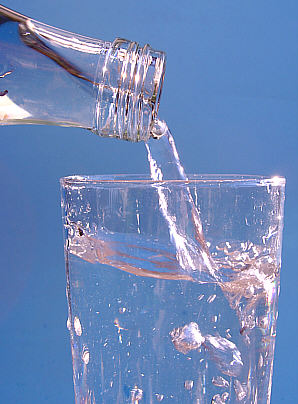
Bottled mineral water usually contains higher TDS levels than tap water.

Total dissolved solids (TDS) is a measure of the dissolved combined content of all inorganic and organic substances present in a liquid in molecular, ionized, or micro-granular (colloidal sol) suspended form. TDS are often measured in parts per million (ppm). TDS in water can be measured using a digital meter.

Generally, the operational definition is that the solids must be small enough to survive filtration through a filter with 2-micrometer (nominal size, or smaller) pores. Total dissolved solids are normally discussed only for freshwater systems, as salinity includes some of the ions constituting the definition of TDS. The principal application of TDS is in the study of water quality for streams, rivers, and lakes. Although TDS is not generally considered a primary pollutant (e.g. it is not deemed to be associated with health effects), it is used as an indication of aesthetic characteristics of drinking water and as an aggregate indicator of the presence of a broad array of chemical contaminants.

Primary sources for TDS in receiving waters are agricultural runoff and residential (urban) runoff, clay-rich mountain waters, leaching of soil contamination, and point source water pollution discharge from industrial or sewage treatment plants. The most common chemical constituents are calcium, phosphates, nitrates, sodium, potassium, and chloride, which are found in nutrient runoff, general stormwater runoff and runoff from snowy climates where road de-icing salts are applied. The chemicals may be cations, anions, molecules or agglomerations on the order of one thousand or fewer molecules, so long as a soluble micro-granule is formed. More exotic and harmful elements of TDS are pesticides arising from surface runoff. Certain naturally occurring total dissolved solids arise from the weathering and dissolution of rocks and soils. The United States has established a secondary water quality standard of 500 mg/L to provide for palatability of drinking water.

Total dissolved solids are differentiated from total suspended solids (TSS), in that the latter cannot pass through a sieve of 2 micrometers and yet are indefinitely suspended in solution. The term settleable solids refers to material of any size that will not remain suspended or dissolved in a holding tank not subject to motion, and excludes both TDS and TSS. Settleable solids may include larger particulate matter or insoluble molecules.

Total dissolved solids include both volatile and non-volatile solids. Volatile solids are ones that can easily go from a solid to a gaseous state. Non-volatile solids must be heated to a high temperature, typically 550 °C, in order to achieve this state change. Examples of non-volatile substances include salts and sugars.

== Measurement ==
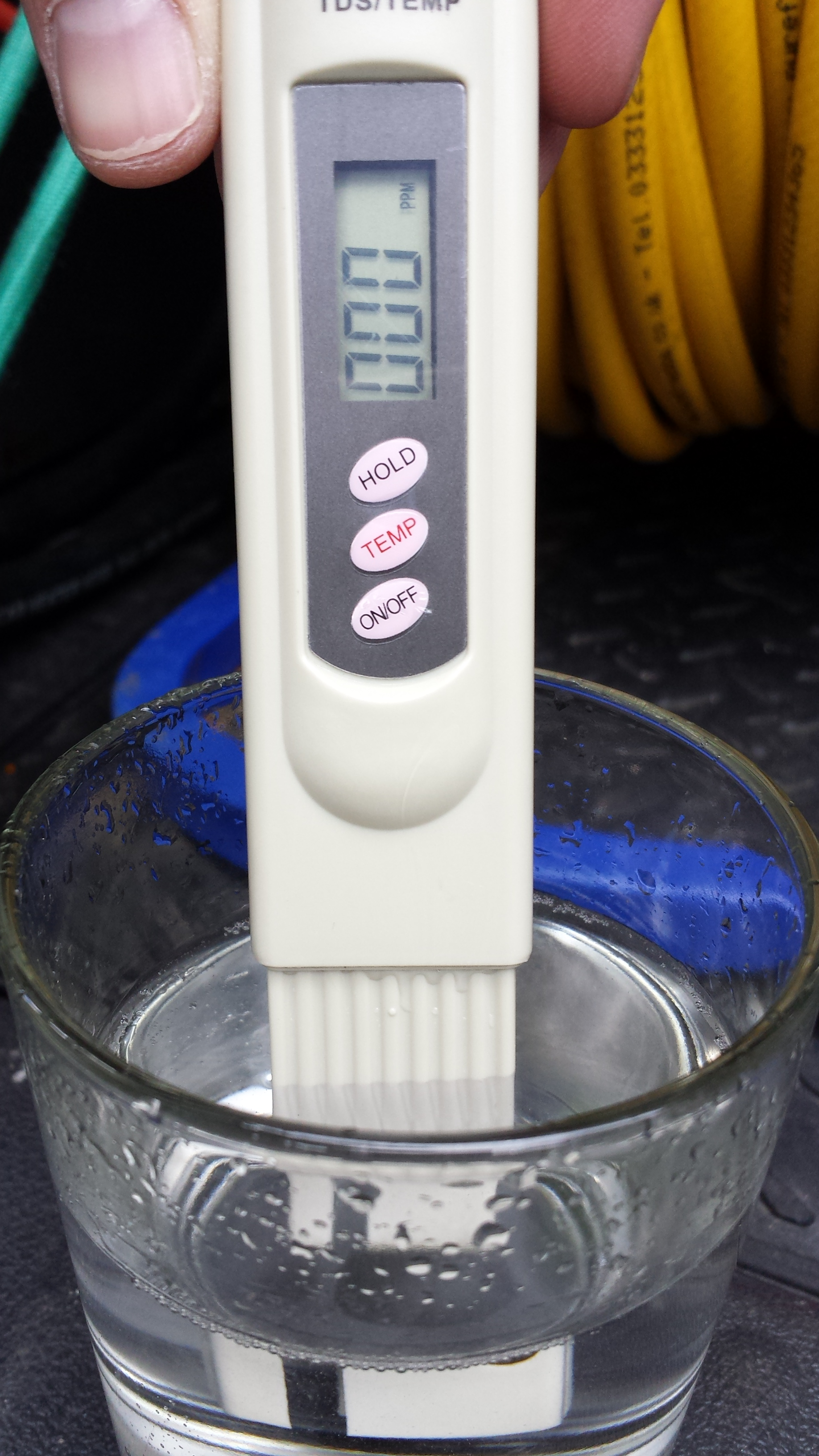
Conductivity based TDS meter in a cup of water

The two principal methods of measuring total dissolved solids are gravimetric analysis and conductivity. Gravimetric methods are the most accurate and involve evaporating the liquid solvent and measuring the mass of residues left. This method is generally the best, although it is time-consuming. If inorganic salts comprise the great majority of TDS, conductivity-based methods are appropriate.

Conductivity of water is directly related to the concentration of dissolved ionized solids. These ions allow the water to conduct electric current. This electric current can be measured using a conventional conductivity meter or TDS meter. When correlated with laboratory TDS measurements, conductivity provides an approximate value for the TDS concentration, with around 10% accuracy.

The relationship of TDS and specific conductance of groundwater can be approximated by the following equation:

TDS = k_{e}EC

where TDS is expressed in mg/L and EC is the electrical conductivity in microsiemens per centimeter at 25 °C. The conversion factor k_{e} varies between 0.55 and 0.8.

Some TDS meters use an electrical conductivity measurement to the ppm using the above formula. Regarding units, 1 ppm indicates 1 mg of dissolved solids per 1,000 g of water.

== Hydrological simulation ==
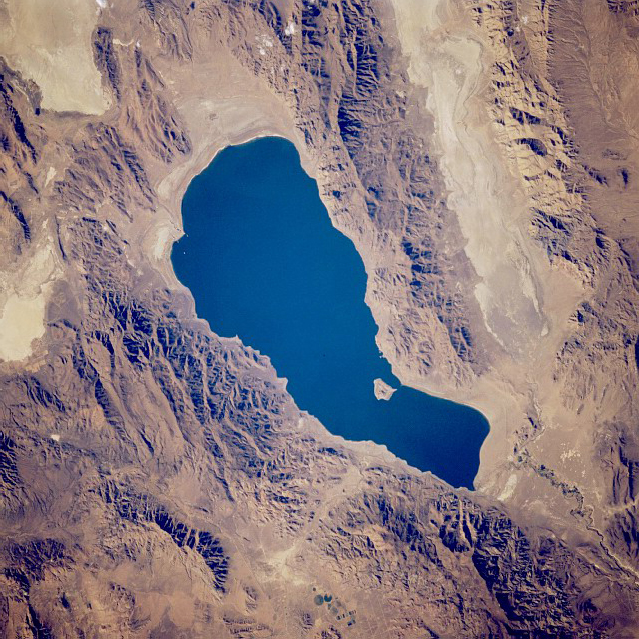
Pyramid Lake, Nevada, receives dissolved solids from the Truckee River.

Hydrologic transport models are used to mathematically analyze movement of TDS within river systems. The most common models address surface runoff, allowing variation in land use type, topography, soil type, vegetative cover, precipitation, and land management practice (e.g. the application rate of a fertilizer). Runoff models have evolved to a good degree of accuracy and permit the evaluation of alternative land management practices upon impacts to stream water quality.

Basin models are used to more comprehensively evaluate total dissolved solids within a catchment basin and dynamically along various stream reaches. The DSSAM model was developed by the U.S. Environmental Protection Agency (EPA). This hydrology transport model is actually based upon the pollutant-loading metric called "Total Maximum Daily Load" (TMDL), which addresses TDS and other specific chemical pollutants. The success of this model contributed to the Agency's broadened commitment to the use of the underlying TMDL protocol in its national policy for management of many river systems in the United States.

== Practical implications ==
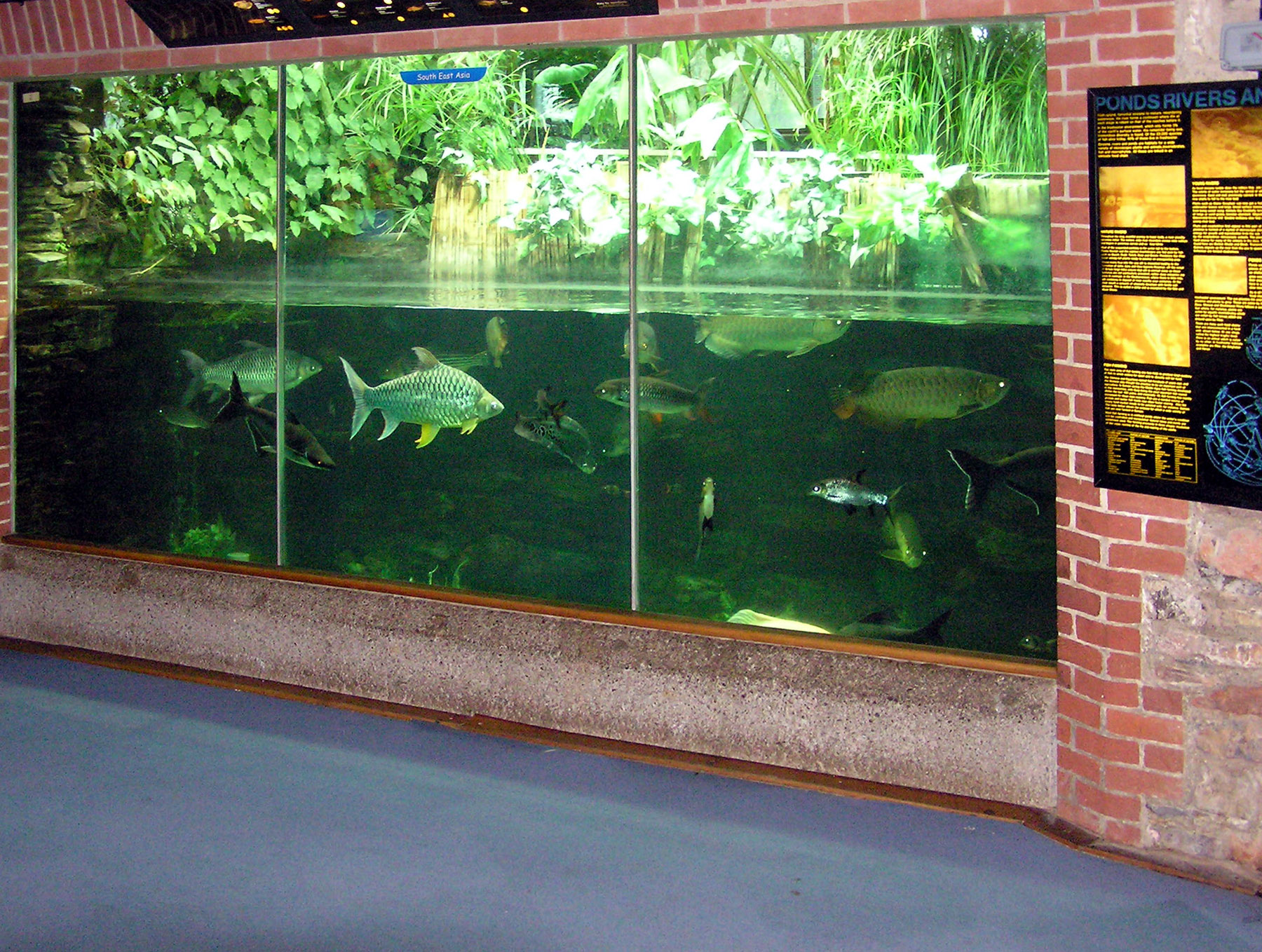
Aquarium at Bristol Zoo, England. Maintenance of filters becomes costly with high TDS.

When measuring water treated with water softeners, high levels of total dissolved solids do not correlate to hard water, as water softeners do not reduce TDS; rather, they replace magnesium and calcium ions, which cause hard water, with an equal charge of sodium or potassium ions, e.g. Ca^{2+} ⇌ 2 Na^{+}, leaving overall TDS unchanged or even increased. Hard water can cause scale buildup in pipes, valves, and filters, reducing performance and adding to system maintenance costs. These effects can be seen in aquariums, spas, swimming pools, and reverse osmosis water treatment systems. Typically, total dissolved solids are tested frequently in these applications, and filtration membranes are checked to prevent adverse effects.

In the case of hydroponics and aquaculture, TDS is often monitored to create a water quality environment favorable for organism productivity. For freshwater, oysters, trouts, and other high-value seafood, the highest productivity and economic returns are achieved by mimicking the TDS and pH levels of each species' native environment. For hydroponic uses, total dissolved solids are considered one of the best indices of nutrient availability for the aquatic plants being grown.

Because the threshold of acceptable aesthetic criteria for human drinking water is 500 mg/L, there is no general concern for odor, taste, and color at a level much lower than is required for harm. Several studies have been conducted that indicate various species' reactions range from intolerance to outright toxicity due to elevated TDS. The numerical results must be interpreted cautiously, as accurate toxicity outcomes relate to specific chemical constituents. Nevertheless, some numerical information is a helpful guide to the nature of risks in exposing aquatic organisms or terrestrial animals to high TDS levels. Most aquatic ecosystems involving mixed fish fauna can tolerate TDS levels of 1000 mg/L.

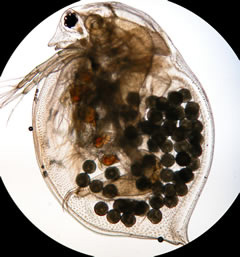
Daphnia magna with eggs

The fathead minnow (Pimephales promelas), for example, realizes an LD_{50} concentration of 5,600 ppm based upon a 96-hour exposure. LD50 is the concentration required to produce a lethal effect on 50 percent of the exposed population. Daphnia magna, a good example of a primary member of the food chain, is a small planktonic crustacean, about 0.5 mm (0.020 in) in length, having an LD50 of about 10,000 ppm TDS for a 96-hour exposure.

Spawning fishes and juveniles appear to be more sensitive to high TDS levels. For example, it was found that concentrations of 350 mg/L TDS reduced spawning of Striped bass (Morone saxatilis) in the San Francisco Bay-Delta region, and that concentrations below 200 mg/L promoted even healthier spawning conditions. In the Truckee River, EPA found that juvenile Lahontan cutthroat trout were subject to higher mortality when exposed to thermal pollution stress combined with high total dissolved solids concentrations.

For terrestrial animals, poultry typically possess a safe upper limit of TDS exposure of approximately 2,900 mg/L, whereas dairy cattle are measured to have a safe upper limit of about 7,100 mg/L. Research has shown that exposure to TDS is compounded in toxicity when other stressors are present, such as abnormal pH, high turbidity, or reduced dissolved oxygen with the latter stressor acting only in the case of Animalia.

In countries with often unsafe/unclean tap water supplies, technicians frequently check the TDS of drinking water to gauge how effectively their RO/Water Filtration devices are working. While TDS readings will not provide the number of microorganisms present in a sample of water, they can indicate how efficient the filter is by the presence of TDS.

== Water classification ==
Water can be classified by the level of total dissolved solids (TDS) in the water:

- Fresh water: TDS is less than 1,000 ppm.
- Brackish water: TDS = 1,000 to 10,000 ppm.
- Saline water: TDS = 10,000 to 35,000 ppm.
- Hypersaline: TDS greater than 35,000 ppm.

Drinking water generally has a TDS below 500 ppm. Higher TDS fresh water is drinkable but taste may be objectionable.

== See also ==
- Acid rain
- Surface runoff
- Regarding meters;
  - EC meter
  - pH meter
  - Salinometer
