= Saline water =

Water that contains a high concentration of dissolved salts

Saline water (more commonly known as salt water) is water that contains a high concentration of dissolved salts (mainly sodium chloride). On the United States Geological Survey (USGS) salinity scale, saline water is saltier than brackish water, but less salty than brine. The salt concentration is usually expressed in parts per thousand (permille, ‰) and parts per million (ppm). The USGS salinity scale defines three levels of saline water. The salt concentration in slightly saline water is 1,000 to 3,000 ppm (0.1–0.3%); in moderately saline water is 3,000 to 10,000 ppm (0.3–1%); and in highly saline water is 10,000 to 35,000 ppm (1–3.5%). Seawater has a salinity of roughly 35,000 ppm, equivalent to 35 grams of salt per one liter (or kilogram) of water. The saturation level is only nominally dependent on the temperature of the water. At 20 °C (68 °F) one liter of water can dissolve about 357 grams of salt, a concentration of 26.3 percent by weight (% w/w). At 100 °C (212 °F) (the boiling temperature of pure water), the amount of salt that can be dissolved in one liter of water increases to about 391 grams, a concentration of 28.1% w/w.

== Properties ==
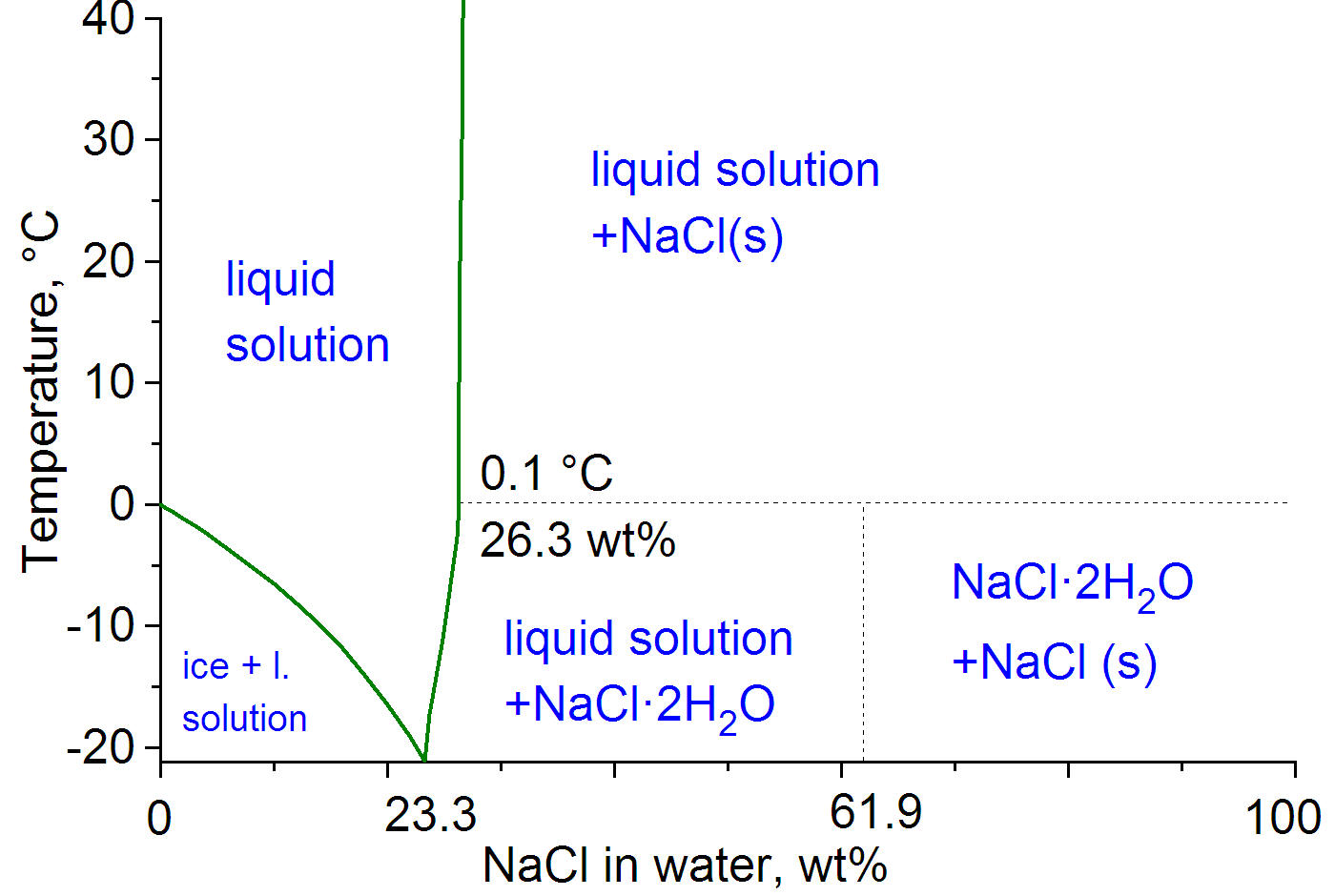
Water-NaCl phase diagram

Properties of water-NaCl mixtures
NaCl, wt%	Freezing point (°C)	Freezing point (°F)	Density (Note: At some ambient temperature) (g/cm^{3})	Refractive index (Note: At some ambient temperature) at 589 nm	Viscosity (Note: At some ambient temperature (20°C)) (cP )
0	0	32	0.99984	1.3330	1.002
0.5	−0.3	31.46	1.0018	1.3339	1.011
1	−0.59	30.94	1.0053	1.3347	1.02
2	−1.19	29.86	1.0125	1.3365	1.036
3	−1.79	28.78	1.0196	1.3383	1.052
4	−2.41	27.66	1.0268	1.3400	1.068
5	−3.05	26.51	1.0340	1.3418	1.085
6	−3.7	25.34	1.0413	1.3435	1.104
7	−4.38	24.12	1.0486	1.3453	1.124
8	−5.08	22.86	1.0559	1.3470	1.145
9	−5.81	21.54	1.0633	1.3488	1.168
10	−6.56	20.19	1.0707	1.3505	1.193
12	−8.18	17.28	1.0857	1.3541	1.25
14	−9.94	14.11	1.1008	1.3576	1.317
16	−11.89	10.60	1.1162	1.3612	1.388
18	−14.04	6.73	1.1319	1.3648	1.463
20	−16.46	2.37	1.1478	1.3684	1.557
(Note: Eutectic mixture)23.3	−21.1	−5.98	1.179		
26	−19.18	−2.52	1.193	1.3795	1.676

At 100 °C (212 °F; 373 K), saturated sodium chloride brine is about 28% salt by weight. At 0 °C (32 °F; 273 K), brine can only hold about 26% salt. At 20 °C one liter of water can dissolve about 357 grams of salt, a concentration of 26.3%.

The thermal conductivity of seawater (3.5% dissolved salt by weight) is 0.6 W/mK at 25 °C (77 °F). The thermal conductivity decreases with increasing salinity and increases with increasing temperature. The salt content can be determined with a salinometer.

Density ρ of brine at various concentrations and temperatures from 200 to 575 °C (392 to 1,067 °F) can be approximated with a linear equation:

$\rho [lb/ft^3]= a_3 - (a_2 \cdot T[F])$

where the values of a_{n} are:

Weight %	a_{2}	a_{3}
5	0.043	72.60
10	0.039	73.72
15	0.035	74.86
20	0.032	76.21
25	0.030	77.85

=== Electrolysis ===
About four percent of hydrogen gas produced worldwide is created by electrolysis. The majority of this hydrogen produced through electrolysis is a side product in the production of chlorine.

- 2 NaCl(aq) + 2 H_{2}O(l) → 2 NaOH(aq) + H_{2}(g) + Cl_{2}(g)
