= Electrical conductivity meter =

Measuring device

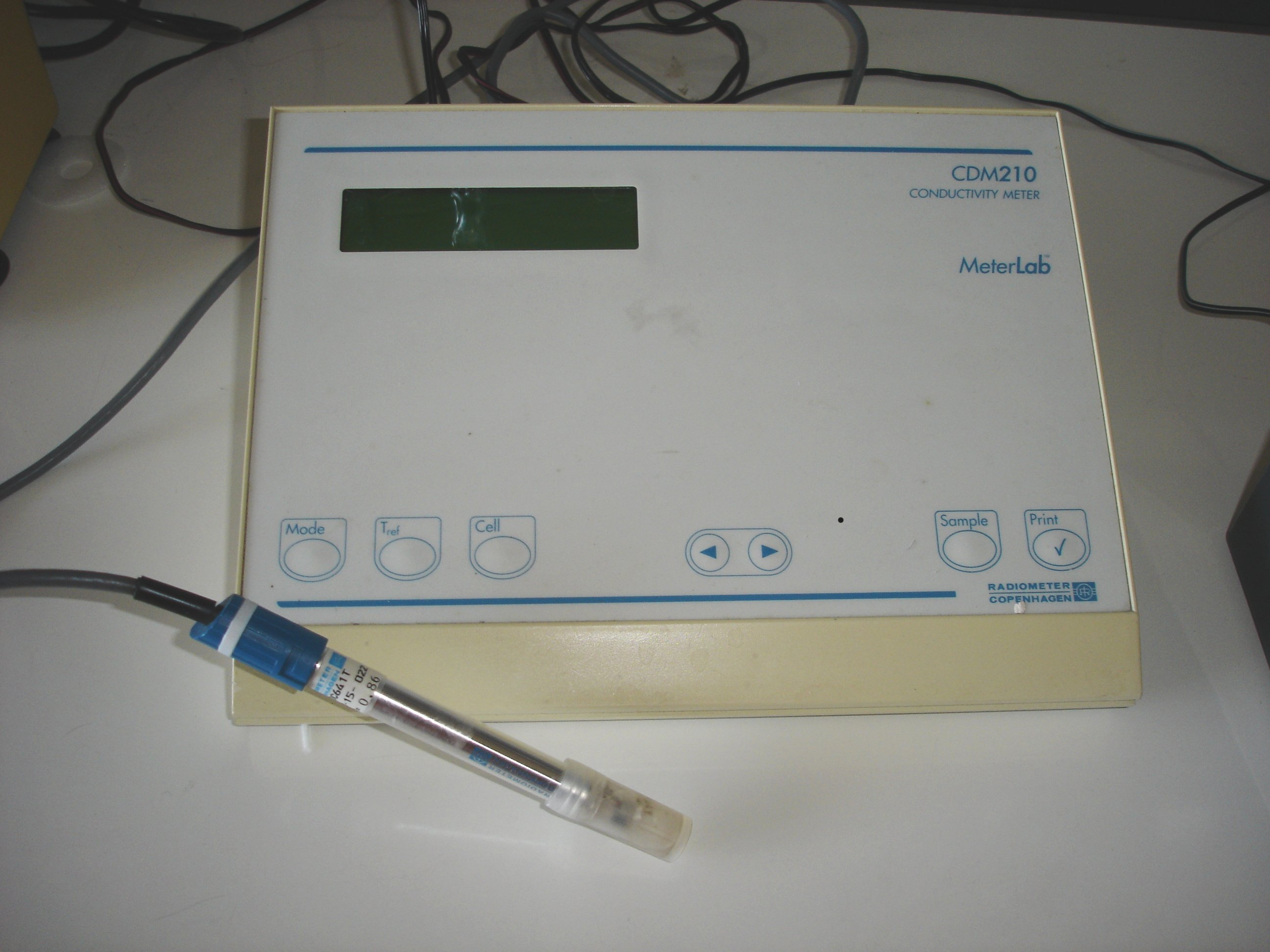
An electrical conductivity meter.

An electrical conductivity meter (EC meter) measures the electrical conductivity in a solution. It has multiple applications in research and engineering, with common usage in hydroponics, aquaculture, aquaponics, and freshwater systems to monitor the amount of nutrients, salts or impurities in the water.

== Principle ==
Common laboratory conductivity meters employ a potentiometric method using a cell consisting of two or four electrodes. The electrodes are typically arranged as parallel plates or rods, or concentric cylinders. The electrodes are made from a material that will not be corroded by the measured fluid, often platinum metal or carbon. An alternating current is applied to the electrodes rather than DC to reduce electrolysis, corrosion, and polarisation of the electrodes, and to allow rejection of DC signals from stray currents or electrochemical potentials.

A 4-electrode probe uses a kelvin sensing arrangement, where the outer electrodes are driven with a known current and the potential across the inner electrodes is sensed. This cancels wire resistance and electrode polarisation, allowing accuracy in high conductivity solutions. A 2-electrode probe drives a known current and senses the resulting voltage across the same electrode pair. This is suitable for low conductivity solutions since the measured resistance can be several orders of magnitude greater than the wire resistance and polarisation.

The scale of the output depends on the geometry of the electrode arrangement, but is generally summed up by a cell constant which relates the measured resistance of the cell to the specific resistance of the solution. To accurately determine this cell constant, a calibration is employed using electrolytes of well-known conductivity. The measured resistance is multiplied by the cell constant to get the specific resistance, so a high cell constant is more suitable for high conductivity solutions, and vice versa.

Industrial conductivity probes often employ an inductive method, which has the advantage that the fluid does not wet the electrical parts of the sensor. Here, two toroidal coils are used. One is the driving coil producing a magnetic field and it is supplied with accurately-known voltage. The other is the sensing coil. The liquid passes through both toroidal coils, inductively coupling them in proportion to its conductivity. The induced current in the sensing coil is detected and the output is calibrated to reject any inherent coupling that is not due to the fluid. The inductive method has limited sensitivity at low conductivity (i.e., very pure water), and is typically applied to corrosive, high fouling, or low maintenance applications.

== Temperature dependence ==
The conductivity of a solution is highly temperature dependent, so it is important either to use a temperature compensated instrument, or to calibrate the instrument at the same temperature as the solution being measured. Unlike metals, the conductivity of common electrolytes typically increases with increasing temperature.

Over a limited temperature range, the way temperature affects the conductivity of a solution can be modeled linearly using the following formula:

$$\sigma_T = {\sigma_{T_{cal}}[1 + \alpha (T - T_{cal})] }$$

where

T is the temperature of the sample,
T_{cal} is the calibration temperature,
σ_{T} is the electrical conductivity at the temperature T,
σ_{T_{cal}} is the electrical conductivity at the calibration temperature T_{cal},
α is the temperature compensation gradient of the solution.

The temperature compensation gradient for most naturally occurring samples of water is about 2%/°C; however it can range between 1 and 3%/°C. The compensation gradients for some common water solutions are listed in the table below.

Aqueous solution at 25 °C	Concentration (mass percentage)	α (%/°C)
HCl	10	1.56
KCl	10	1.88
H_{2}SO_{4}	50	1.93
NaCl	10	2.14
HF	1.5	7.20
HNO_{3}	31	31

== Conductivity measurement applications ==
Conductivity measurement is a versatile tool in process control. The measurement is simple and fast, and most advanced sensors require only a little maintenance. The measured conductivity reading can be used to make various assumptions on what is happening in the process. In some cases it is possible to develop a model to calculate the concentration of the liquid.

Concentration of pure liquids can be calculated when the conductivity and temperature is measured. The preset curves for various acids and bases are commercially available. For example, one can measure the concentration of high purity hydrofluoric acid using conductivity-based concentration measurement [Zhejiang Quhua Fluorchemical, China Valmet Concentration 3300]. A benefit of conductivity- and temperature-based concentration measurement is the superior speed of inline measurement compared to an on-line analyzer.

Conductivity-based concentration measurement has limitations. The concentration-conductivity dependence of most acids and bases is not linear. Conductivity-based measurement cannot determine on which side of the peak the measurement is, and therefore the measurement is only possible on a linear section of the curve. Kraft pulp mills use conductivity-based concentration measurement to control alkali additions to various stages of the cook. Conductivity measurement will not determine the specific amount of alkali components, but it is a good indication on the amount of effective alkali (NaOH + 1/2 Na_{2}S as NaOH or Na_{2}O) or active alkali (NaOH + Na_{2}S as NaOH or Na_{2}O) in the cooking liquor. The composition of the liquor varies between different stages of the cook. Therefore, it is necessary to develop a specific curve for each measurement point or to use commercially available products.

The high pressure and temperature of cooking process, combined with high concentration of alkali components, put a heavy strain on conductivity sensors that are installed in process. The scaling on the electrodes needs to be taken into account, otherwise the conductivity measurement drifts, requiring increased calibration and maintenance.

== See also ==
- Conductivity factor
- Salinometer
- Total dissolved solids
- TDS meter
