= Jeff Smith (Missouri politician) =

American politician

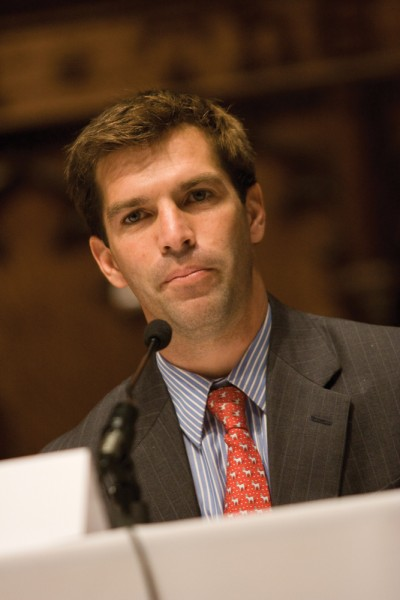

Member of the Missouri Senate from the 4th district
- In office January 3, 2007 – August 25, 2009
- Succeeded by: Joseph Keaveny

Personal details
- Born: December 9, 1973 (age 52) St. Louis, Missouri, U.S.
- Party: Democratic
- Spouse: Teresa Wallace (m. 2011-2023)
- Children: 2
- Education: University of North Carolina at Chapel Hill (BA); Washington University in St. Louis (MA, PhD)

Jeff Smith (born December 9, 1973) is an American politician who served as a member of the Missouri Senate, representing the 4th district from 2007 until 2009. His district covered the western portion of the City of St. Louis. In 2009, he was imprisoned for lying to federal authorities about illegal campaign activities in 2004. He had pleaded guilty to two counts of obstruction of justice for lying about his role in an illegal negative mailer against Russ Carnahan, who eventually won the 2004 primary and general elections for Missouri's 3rd Congressional District.

Prior to his political career, Smith co-founded Confluence Academies, a group of urban charter schools in St. Louis that now enroll nearly 4,000 students. He authored a book chronicling the injustices faced by those incarcerated, Mr. Smith Goes to Prison. excerpted by Politico.

== Early life and education ==
Smith was raised in the St. Louis suburb of Olivette, Missouri and graduated from Ladue Horton Watkins High School. He attended the University of North Carolina at Chapel Hill, graduating Phi Beta Kappa with a double major in African-American Studies and political science. He received his MA and PhD in political science from Washington University in St. Louis.

== Career ==
=== Academics ===
Smith taught as a professor of public policy in a M.A. and Ph.D. program at The New School in Manhattan from 2011 to 2016. Before seeking office and while serving in the Missouri Senate, Smith taught as an adjunct and visiting professor in the Arts and Sciences at Washington University in St. Louis, the University of Missouri–St. Louis, and Dartmouth College and won the 2002 Washington University in St. Louis Dean's Award for Teaching Excellence. During his time at Dartmouth, he dated one of his former students, future political strategist Lis Smith. In 2001, Smith co-founded the Confluence Academy, a charter school in North St. Louis focusing on math and science education.

=== 2004 U.S. House campaign ===
In 2004, Smith was a candidate in the crowded Democratic primary election for the U.S. House of Representatives to replace retiring Congressman Dick Gephardt. Beginning as an unknown, Smith finished second in the ten-candidate field, narrowly losing to Russ Carnahan. His campaign was widely recognized as an example of successful grassroots organizing. It was the subject of the documentary film Can Mr. Smith Get to Washington Anymore?, which won the 2006 audience choice award at the Silverdocs film festival. In February 2007, the documentary aired on the award-winning PBS series Independent Lens.

==== Criminal conviction ====
In the primary approach to the 2004 congressional election, a representative, unknown at the time to be working for a group called Voters for Truth, approached members of Smith's campaign staff, offering to create and send out campaign mail regarding opponent Russ Carnahan's inconsistent voting record. Campaign staff subsequently approached Smith, who told them he had no opinion on the issue, and regardless of what decision they came to, not to share with him any of the details in order to avoid the possibility of campaign malfeasance. In September 2004, Smith submitted an affidavit to the Federal Election Commission relating to an accused conspiracy with the group Voters for Truth, occurring in the summer of 2004. Smith certified that he knew nothing in detail regarding the mailing sent by Voters for Truth.

In January 2009, the FBI and the U.S. Attorney's Office, acting upon newly discovered information, opened a criminal investigation to determine whether anyone had attempted to obstruct the Federal Election Commission proceeding. Smith's former friend and associate Steve Brown was approached by the FBI to wear a wire. Brown escaped a jail sentence by recording conversations with Smith, in which Brown deliberately brought up the topic of the campaign mailings. Smith pleaded guilty to two felony counts of conspiracy to obstruct justice. Each conspiracy count is punishable by up to 20 years in prison and $250,000 in fines. He resigned effective August 25, 2009, and was sentenced to one year and a day of prison. He also was fined $50,000.

Smith was sentenced to one year and one day in prison. His lawyer subsequently requested Smith be sent to a prison camp in Marion, Illinois. However, Smith was sent to the camp at Federal Correctional Institution, Manchester in Kentucky. In late August 2010 he was released to a halfway house in St. Louis. In November 2010, he was released early from the halfway house and is no longer in federal custody.

=== Missouri Senate ===
==== 2006 election ====
A year after his unsuccessful congressional campaign, Smith announced his intention to seek the Missouri Senate seat being vacated by Pat Dougherty. The race was heavily contested and other candidates included State Representatives Yaphett El-Amin, and Amber Boykins, former State Representative Derio Gambaro, and former St. Louis Alderman Kenny Jones. Smith won the primary election on August 8, 2006, and was unopposed in the general election.

==== Tenure ====
On December 22, 2008, Smith introduced Paternity Reform legislation in the Missouri State Senate. Sen. Smith's SB 140 created "fathering courts" throughout the state, while SB 141 is generally like the model legislation. Governor Jay Nixon signed both bills into law shortly after the 2009 legislative session. Smith also emerged in 2009 as the Legislature's leading advocate for historic preservation tax credits, and he sponsored and passed legislation creating a state Green Sales Tax Holiday eliminating sales tax on energy efficient appliances during the week of Earth Day each year.

== Personal life ==
In spring 2011, Smith was married; in September of the same year, he and his wife Teresa had their first child. Smith accepted a professorship in urban policy at the New School's Milano Graduate School of Management and Urban Policy in New York City. He began writing for the website The Recovering Politician and contributing to Politico - The Arena. His writing has been published in Inc. magazine and praised in New York Magazine's Approval Matrix. In 2012, Smith gave a TED talk in New York titled "Lessons in business ... from prison". In 2015, Smith published a book, Mr. Smith Goes to Prison, which details his time in politics and federal prison.

== See also ==
- Campaign finance in the United States
