= Federal Correctional Institution, Manchester =

Medium-security prison in Kentucky, US

Coordinates: 37°10′46″N 83°47′22″W

- Interactive map of Federal Correctional Institution, Manchester
- Location: Clay County, near Manchester, Kentucky
- Status: Operational
- Security class: Medium-security (with minimum-security prison camp)
- Population: 1,100 (500 in prison camp)
- Managed by: Federal Bureau of Prisons
- Warden: C. Hilliard

The Federal Correctional Institution, Manchester (FCI Manchester) is a medium-security United States federal prison for male inmates in unincorporated Clay County, Kentucky. It is operated by the Federal Bureau of Prisons, a division of the United States Department of Justice. The facility also has an adjacent satellite prison camp for minimum-security male offenders.

FCI Manchester is located in eastern Kentucky, approximately 75 miles (121 km) south of Lexington, the state's second-largest city.

== In media ==
In August 2009, Jeff Smith, then a Missouri state senator, pleaded guilty to two counts of obstruction of justice and resigned his seat. Smith was subsequently sentenced to one year in federal prison and served eight months at FCI Manchester. The business magazine Inc. published an article written by Smith on its website in which Smith described his experience at the prison:

It was my first week in a federal prison, and I was beginning to see that it was far more nuanced than the hotbed of sex, drugs, and violence depicted on television documentaries. It was teeming with ambitious, street-smart men, many who appear to have been very successful drug dealers on the outside, and some of whom possess business instincts as sharp as those of the CEOs who wined and dined me six months before.

== Notable inmates (current and former) ==
- Enrique Tarrio Register No. 98721-004

== See also ==
- List of U.S. federal prisons
- Federal Bureau of Prisons
- Incarceration in the United States
