= Kratky method =

Passive hydroponic technique

The Kratky method is a passive hydroponic technique for growing plants suspended above a reservoir of nutrient-rich water. Because it is a non-circulating technique, no additional inputs of water or nutrients are needed after the original application, and no electricity, pumps, or water and oxygen circulation systems are required. The Kratky method has applications both for commercial food production and as a small-scale and low-maintenance technique for home growers. It has been described as "the simplest hydroponic system."

== Description ==
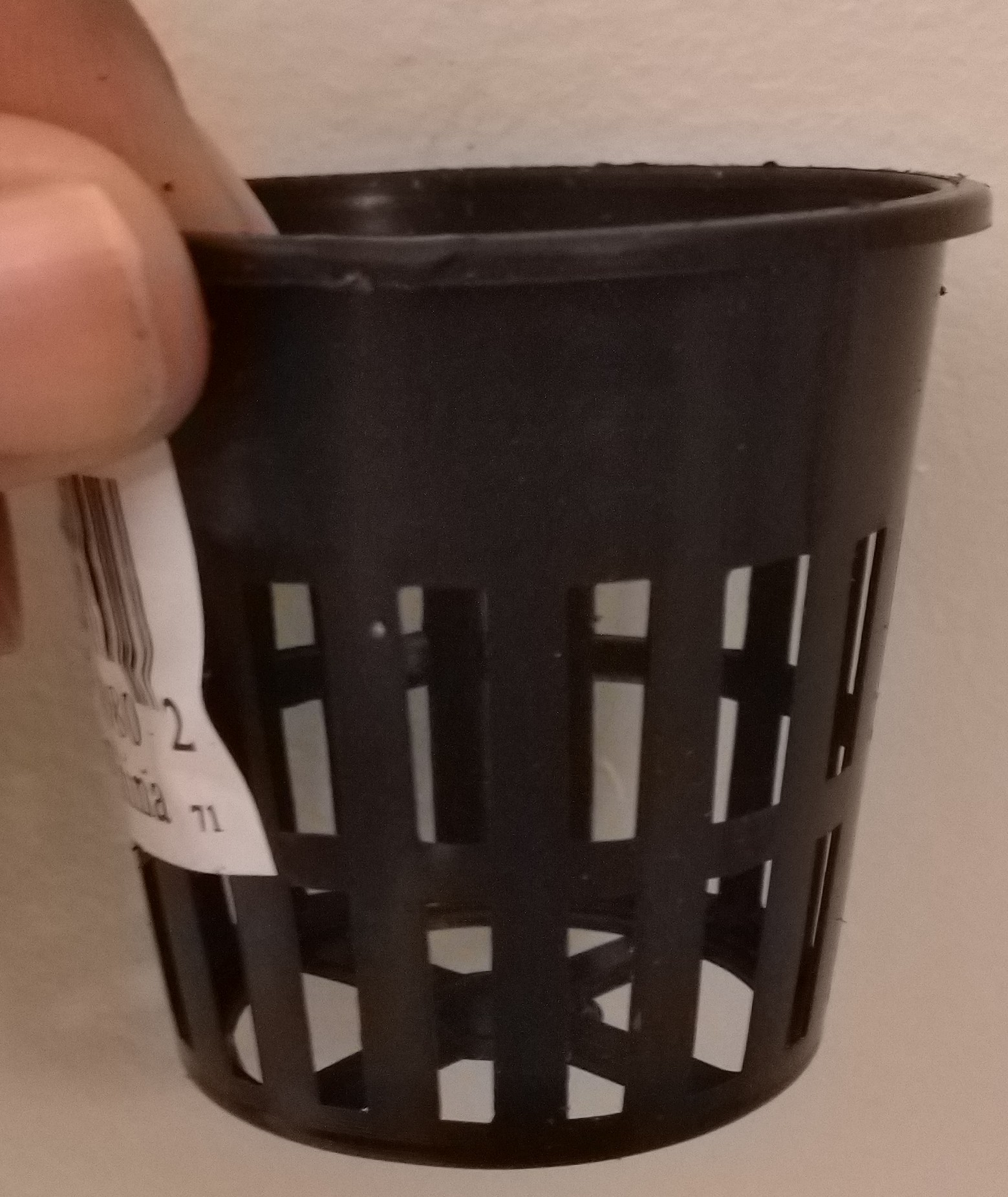
A 2" net pot, which can be used as part of a Kratky system

Plants are placed in net cups filled with an inert growth medium such as rock wool, expanded clay aggregate, sphagnum moss, or coconut coir. The net cups are suspended above a reservoir of water containing essential nutrients in solution. Only the root tips are allowed to touch the surface of the reservoir. As the plant grows and depletes the water level, a gap of moist air will form and expand between the water surface and the base of the plant. The roots in this gap become laterally branching "oxygen roots," and absorb oxygen from the air inside the container. By the time the water level is fully depleted, the plant should be ready to harvest. Thus, in one growing cycle, no additional replenishment of water or nutrients is needed beyond the initial application.

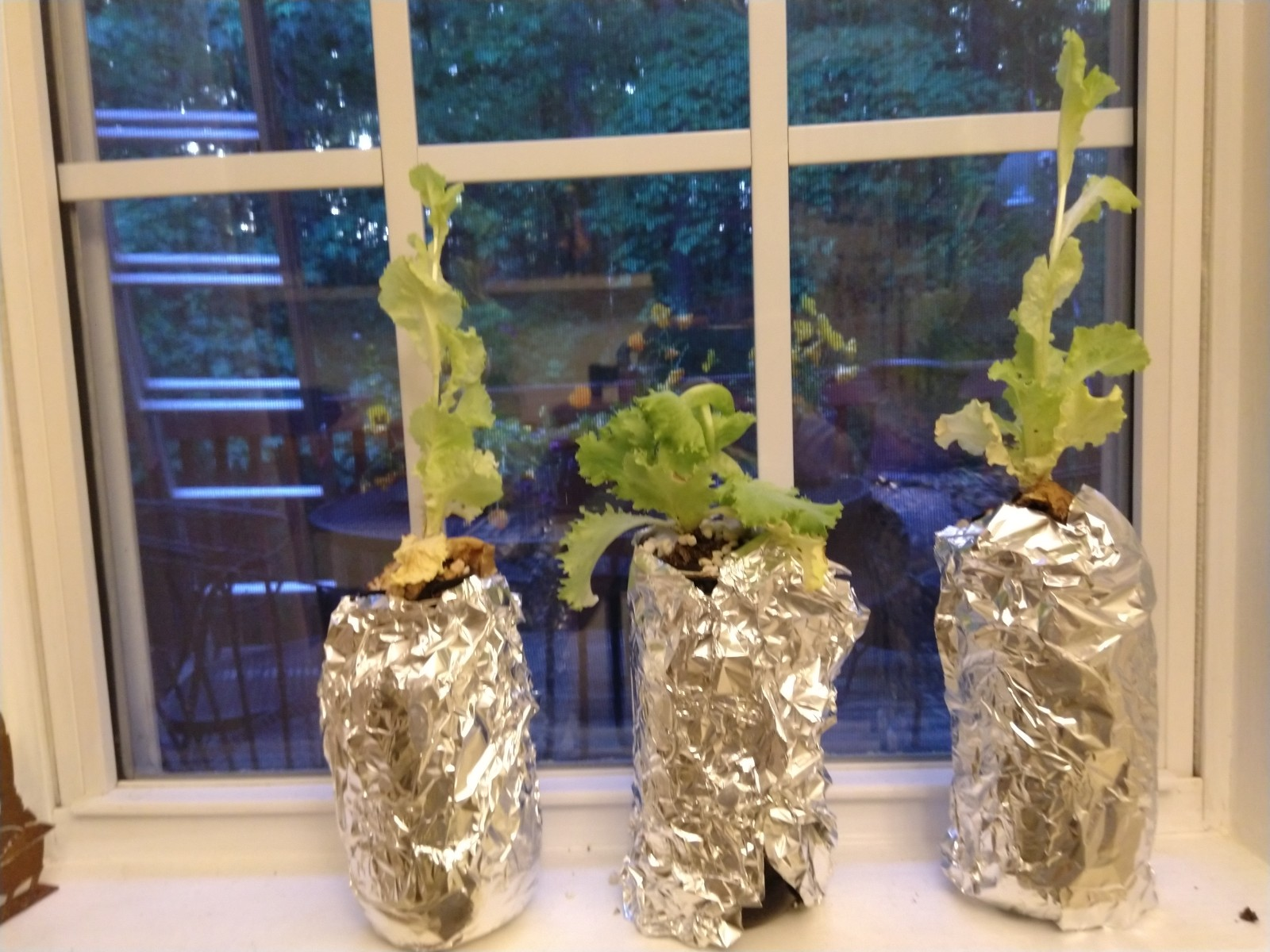
Three lettuce plants grown using the Kratky method in mason jars

The method is named after Bernard Kratky, a researcher at the University of Hawaii, who first proposed the method in the journal Acta Horticulturae in 2009. In the article, Kratky discusses using floating pallets for commercial food production. Multiple plants are placed in net pots on boards that float atop a shared reservoir, with support beams slightly underneath the water level. As water is depleted, the boards eventually come to rest on the support beams, providing an air gap to allow oxygen intake. The Kratky method has also found popularity among home growers, and is often carried out on smaller scales in containers such as buckets and mason jars. The technique is designed for leafy vegetables that do not consume large amounts of water, so the water supply does not need to be continually replenished.

Growing cannabis using the Kratky method.

== See also ==
- Deep water culture
- Passive hydroponics
