= Frank Kenneth Goward =

Nuclear Scientist

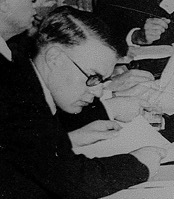
- Born: 1919
- Died: March 1954 (aged 34–35)
- Scientific career
- Fields: Aerial technology, particle acceleration
- Workplaces: Telecommunications Research Establishment; CERN

Frank Kenneth Goward (1919 – March 1954) was an English scientist, specialized on aerial technologies and particle accelerator development.

== Early career ==
During World War II, Goward worked as a specialist on antenna technologies at the Telecommunications Research Establishment (TRE) at Malvern in England. After the war had ended, the focus of his research shifted to new ways to accelerate particles. During 1946, he used a converted betatron from the American accelerator pioneer Donald William Kerst to demonstrate the first synchrotron acceleration of electrons to 8 MeV at Woolwich Arsenal. After that, the machine was moved to Malvern, where it was improved further. This work culminated in October 1947, when Goward and his team managed to obtain a stable beam, thus creating the first fully operational synchrotron.

== Work for CERN ==
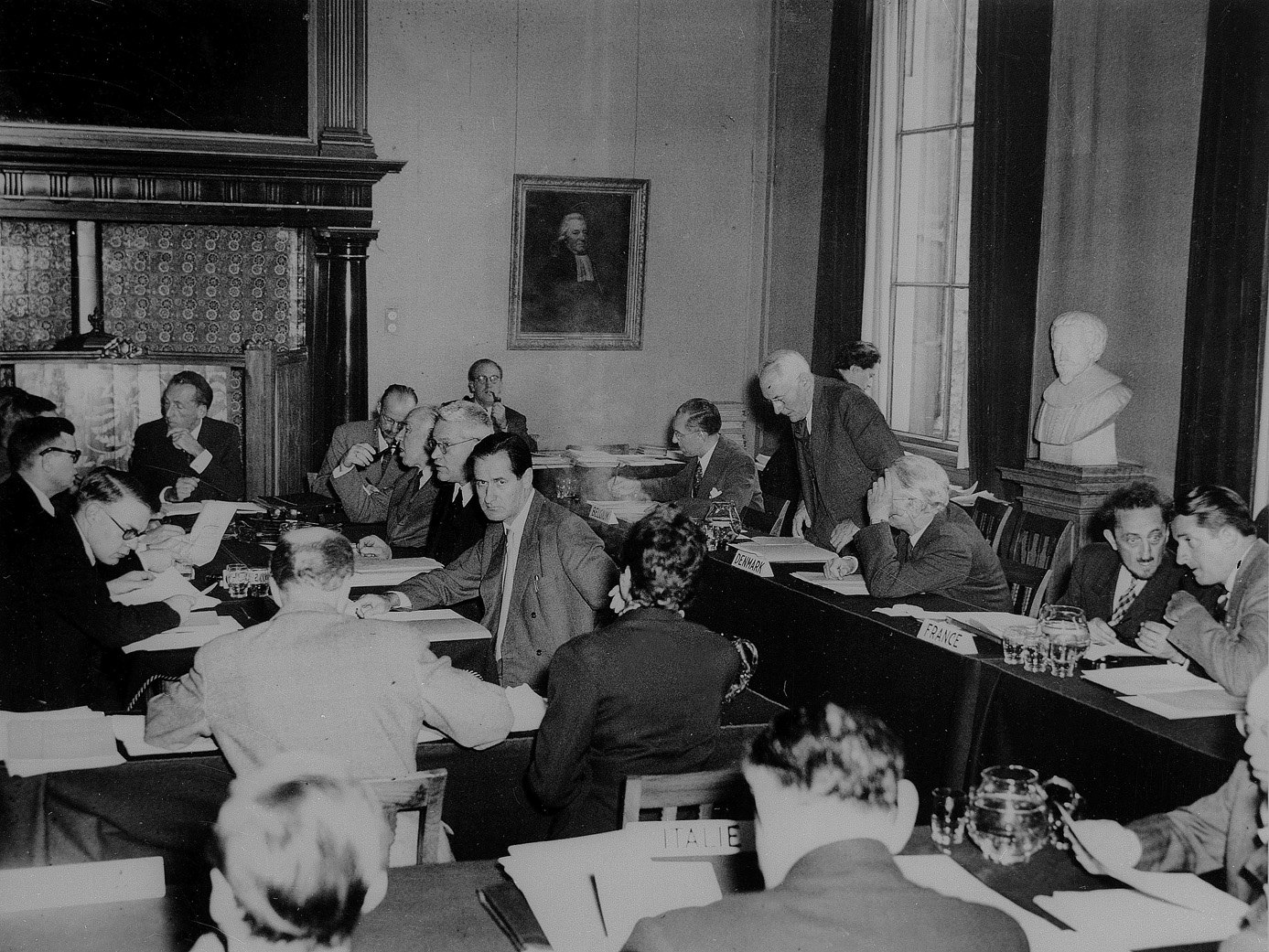
Third session of the provisional CERN council in Amsterdam on 4 October 1952. Goward is depicted on the far left side of the picture, looking down and reading. He has a side-parting and wears glasses.

After TRE's research focus shifted away from synchrotron accelerators in 1950, Goward started to become interested in the idea of a joint European research facility that would focus on the peaceful exploitation of nuclear physics, which would later become CERN. Although United Kingdom (U.K.) government officials were very averse to this idea at the beginning, leading scientists of the country tried to encourage an involvement of the U. K. in this venture. Among these was John Cockcroft, who sent Goward as an observer to the first planning meetings in 1951. At the first session of the provisional CERN council in May 1952, Goward was elected deputy director of the study group which was in charge of studies and investigations about the future Proton Synchrotron (PS), a novel accelerator that would reach energies of up to 10 GeV. The director of the study group was the Norwegian Odd Dahl.

With the initial PS group, Goward developed ideas and techniques to build CERN's first synchrotron. This work got a defining boost when Goward, together with his colleagues Odd Dahl and Rolf Widerøe, visited Brookhaven National Lab in the United States. There, they learned about the newly developed alternating-gradient principle. In the fall of 1953, Goward moved to Geneva permanently and became the project leader of the PS group, assembling a team to build the machine. Soon after, he became seriously ill, which forced him to return to England. He died in March 1954. John Adams, who would later become Director General of CERN, was Goward's successor as leader of the PS group.

In honour of Frank Goward, a street at CERN's main campus in Meyrin is named after him. (See list of streets at CERN).
