= Salinometer =

Device designed to measure the salinity of a solution

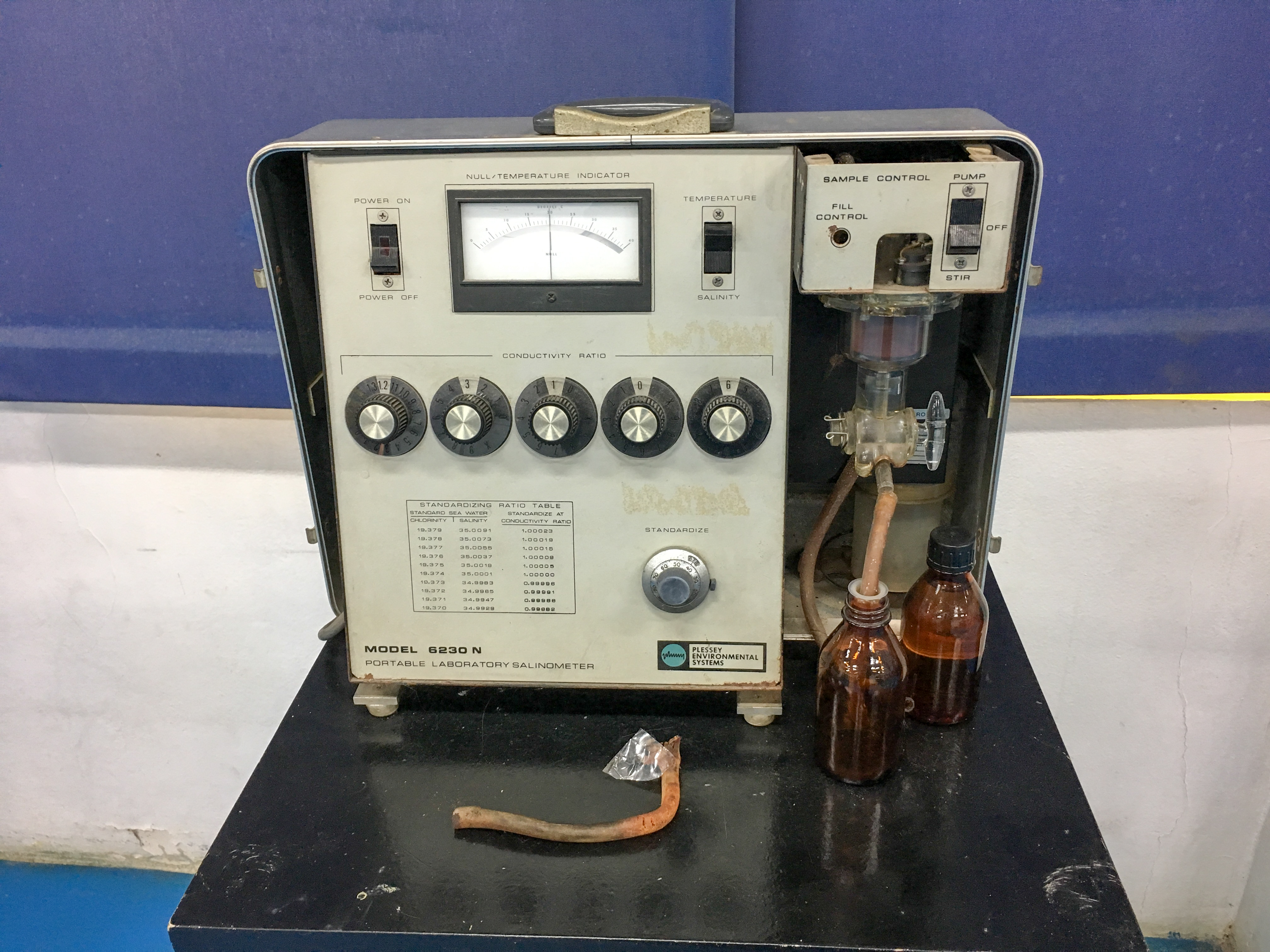
A salinometer

A salinometer is a device designed to measure the salinity, or dissolved salt content, of a solution.

Since the salinity affects both the electrical conductivity and the specific gravity of a solution, a salinometer often consist of an ec meter or hydrometer and some means of converting those readings to a salinity reading. A salinometer may be calibrated in either micromhos, a unit of electrical conductivity, (usually 0-22) or else directly calibrated for salt in 'grains per gallon' (0-0.5). A typical reading on-board ship would be 2 micromhos or 0.05 grains per gallon. A reading of twice this may trigger a warning light or alarm.

== Applications ==
Fresh water generators (Evaporators) use salinometers on the distillate discharge in order to gauge the quality of the water. Water from the evaporator can be destined for potable water supplies, so salty water is not desirable for human consumption.

In some ships, extremely high quality distillate is required for use in water-tube boilers, where salt water would be disastrous. In these ships, a salinometer is also installed on the feed system where it would alert the engineer to any salt contamination. The salinometer may switch the evaporator's output from fresh-water to feed-water tanks automatically, depending on the water quality. The higher quality (lower salinity) is required for the boiler feedwater, not for drinking.

== See also ==
- TDS meter – used for checking of Total Dissolved solids of a liquid.
- Saline (medicine) – A saline solution being isotonic with that of human blood is 0.9% w/v, c. 300 mOsm/L (and this being the same as the salinity of the ocean is a common myth. The ocean on average has a much higher concentration of sodium chloride as well as many other salts. This is why ocean water is not suitable for drinking)
- Saline refractometer
