= Odd Dahl =

Norwegian engineer and aviator (1898–1994)

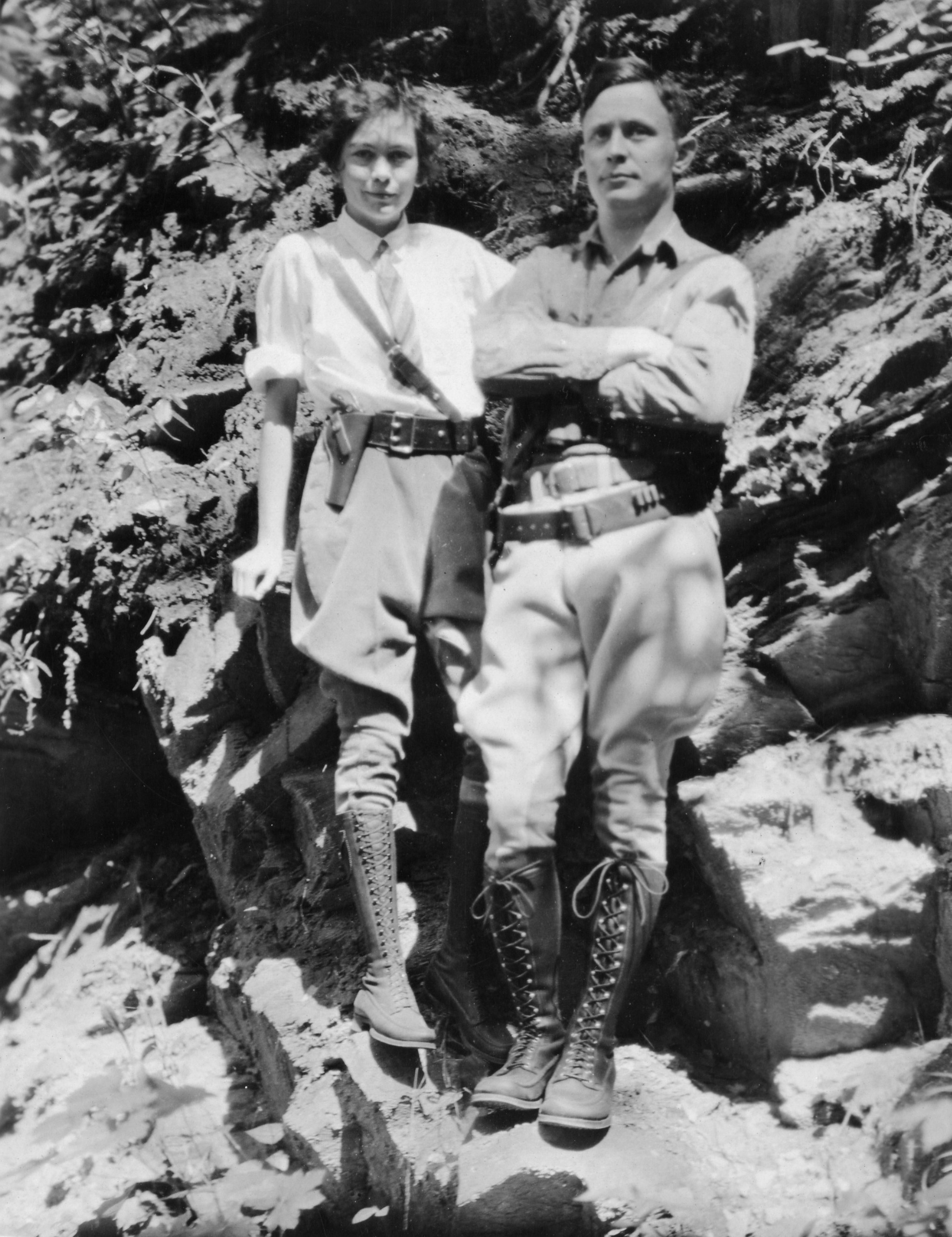
- Odd Dahl with his first wife Anna
- Born: 3 November 1898; Drammen, Norway
- Died: 2 June 1994 (aged 95); Bergen
- Occupations: Engineer, explorer
- Spouse: Anna "Vesse" Mathiesen (m. 1927; died 1959)
- Partner: Elisa Margrethe Munck
- Children: Per Fridtjof Dahl, Karin Dahl
- Honours: Order of St. Olav, Honorary doctorate University of Bergen, Order of Orange-Nassau

Odd Dahl (3 November 1898 – 2 June 1994) was a Norwegian engineer and explorer. He is particularly remembered for his contributions to research in nuclear physics.

== Biography ==
He was born at Drammen in Buskerud, Norway, the son of businessman Lauritz Dahl (1858-1932) and his wife Olga Sørensen. Dahl attended an evening technical school during his teenage years. In 1917, he was employed by Fenger Hagen, an electrical engineer with an interest in radio telephony. In 1921, Dahl was admitted as a student at the Army Flyvevæsens flight school at Kjeller in Skedsmo where he received an international pilot's license. Roald Amundsen hired him in 1922 as a pilot, mechanic, radio operator and cinematographer on an expedition in the Arctic Ocean in an effort to fly over the North Pole. After three test flights, the plane was wrecked in flight. However, Odd Dahl's research work made the expedition considered successful. He was later awarded the Order of St. Olav for his participation in the expedition. One of Dahl's main tasks were to take observations and maintain and construct instruments for the expedition's scientific director, Harald Sverdrup, who at the time was employed at The Carnegie Institution of Washington. Despite his very limited formal education, he recommended Dahl seek employment there after the expedition's end in 1925.

=== Physics ===
After a year at the Carnegie Institution, he became involved in developing devices for high voltages for use in nuclear physics, an area where the United States at that time was lagging behind Europe. In 1926, together with Merle Tuve and Lawrence Hafstad, he constructed a Van de Graaf generator for the Carnegie Institution for Science. Ten years later he did the same for Chr. Michelsen Institute (CMI) in Bergen. In the early stages of CERN, Dahl was invited to participate and finally in 1952 to lead the Proton Synchrotron Group's work, to which his contribution had a definitive role.

== Personal life ==
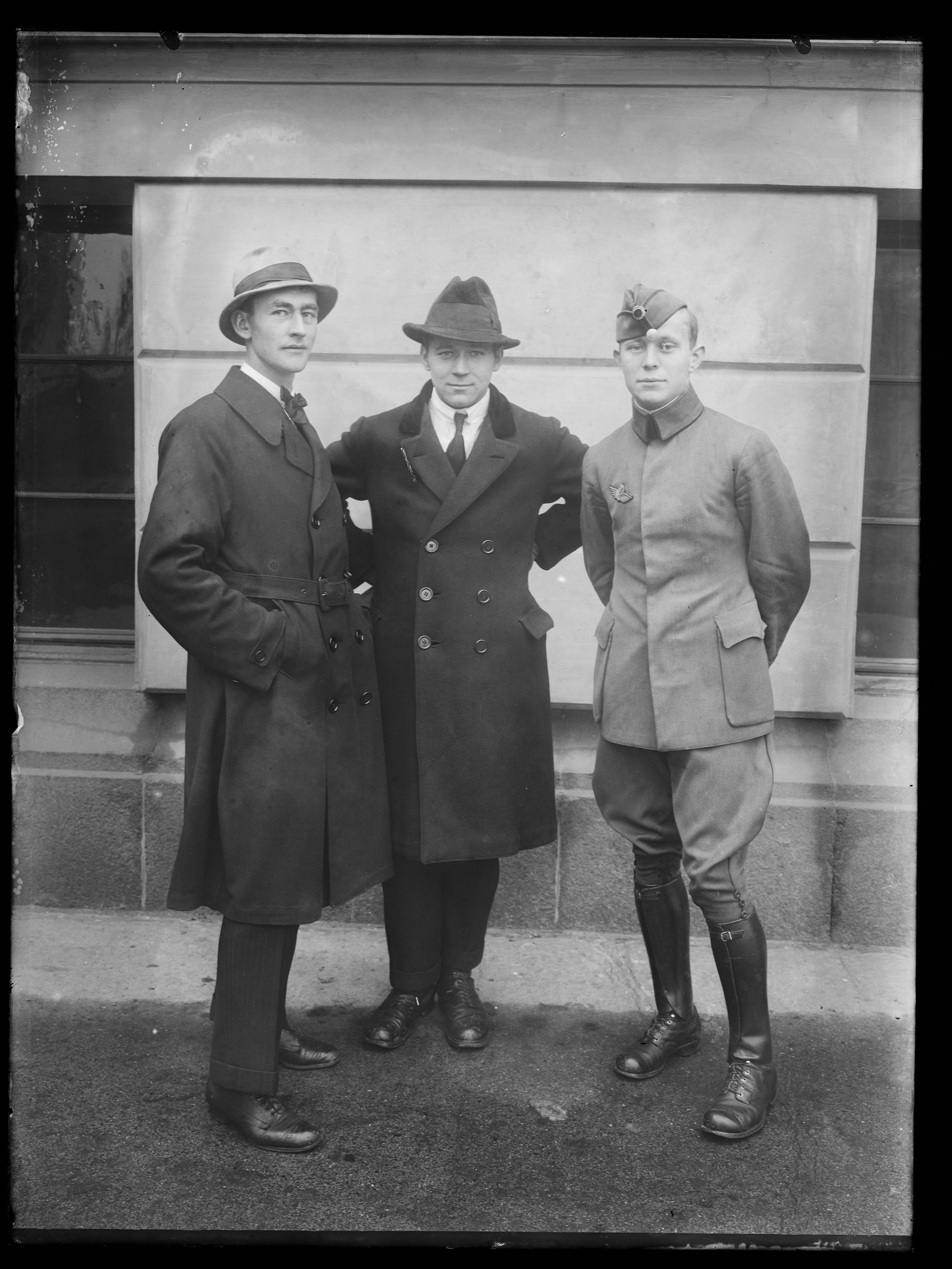
Dahl (right) with Oskar Omdal and Odd Arnesen

In 1927, he married Anna Augusta Selmer Mathiesen (1904-1959), daughter of Dr. Johan Berger Mathiesen (1872-1923) and Augusta Selmer (1878-1923). They had two children, Karin Dahl, who died at the age of thirteen and Per Fridtjof Dahl, who became a researcher in accelerator physics.

In his late life, Odd Dahl, had a partnership with Elisa Margrethe Munck f. Anthonisen (b. 1903), daughter of consul Fredrik J.E. Anthonisen (1872-1963) and Marie Boe Christensen (1874-1936).
