= Ernest Goward =

English cricketer

Ernest Goward (10 August 1896 – 17 September 1961) was an English cricketer. He was a right-handed batsman who played for Bengal. He was born in Barrackpore (now Barakpur) and died in Virginia Water.

Goward made a single first-class appearance for the team, having made an appearance for a British in Bengal team against Marylebone Cricket Club nine seasons previously.

Goward's first-class appearance came in the 1935-36 Ranji Trophy, against Madras, against whom he scored a duck in the first innings and 16 runs in the second.
