= Michele Kratky =

American politician

Member of the Missouri House of Representatives from the 82nd district
- In office 2009–2017
- Preceded by: Fred Kratky
- Succeeded by: Donna Baringer

Personal details
- Born: January 19, 1957 (age 69) Saint Louis, Missouri
- Party: Democratic
- Spouse: Fred Kratky
- Children: four
- Profession: government relations executive, legal secretary, courtroom clerk

Michele Kratky (born January 19, 1957) is an American politician. She was a member of the Missouri House of Representatives, having served from 2009 – 2017. She is a member of the Democratic party.

== Early life ==
Kratky was born and raised in south St. Louis, where she attended St. Mary Magdalene and Immaculate Heart of Marcy parish schools. She graduated from Southwest High School in 1975. Her mother, Eileen O'Toole, was the committeewoman of the 16th Ward Regular Democratic organization and a confidante of Mayor A.J. Cervantes. Through her mother, Kratky was exposed at an early age to Democratic politics and public service. She was raised Roman Catholic.

== Career ==
Kratky was first elected to the Missouri House of Representatives in 2008. Previously she served as the director of governmental affairs for the St. Louis Association of REALTORS. Prior to that, she worked for years as a legal secretary, and briefly as a court clerk.

== Personal life ==
Kratky married Fred Kratky, himself a former Missouri State Representative, in 1980. Together, they have four sons, and one granddaughter.
