= Pat Dougherty =

American Democratic politician

Patrick Dougherty (born June 30, 1948) is an American Democratic politician. Due to term limits, he retired from political life in 2007 after nearly 30 years of service in the Missouri General Assembly.

== Education and background ==
Patrick Dougherty was born in Decatur, Illinois. He attended Quincy College and graduated with a BA degree and also attended Kenrick Theological Seminary. Prior to entering politics, he was a caseworker for the Department of Family Services.

== Political career ==
In 1978, Dougherty ran for State Representative in a South St. Louis district close to Tower Grove Park. He challenged John Blassie, a 12-year incumbent, and defeated him in the Democratic primary. Dougherty went on to win the general election. Dougherty won re-election eleven times, serving in the House until 2001.

In 2001, Dougherty was the Democratic nominee in a special election to fill the State Senate seat vacated by Lacy Clay when Clay was elected to Congress in November 2000. Dougherty won the election with nearly 84% of the vote. Upon his election to the Senate, Dougherty resigned his seat in the Missouri House of Representatives. He was succeeded by Mike Daus.

In 2002, Dougherty sought election to a full term in the State Senate. He was opposed by State Representative O.L. Shelton in the Democratic primary. Dougherty defeated Shelton in the primary election, and was unopposed in the general election.

During his career in the Missouri House and Senate, Dougherty, a former social worker, has focused on issues impacting families and children. When the Democrats controlled the Missouri House, Dougherty served as chair of the Children, Youth and Families Committee.

Due to term limits Doughtery was unable to run for re-election in 2006. Jeff Smith won a heavily contested Democratic primary to replace Dougherty.

== Notes ==
Preceded by Lacy Clay	Missouri Senator - 4th District; 2001–2007	Succeeded by Jeff Smith
