= Fred Kratky =

American politician

Member of the Missouri House of Representatives from the 82nd district
- In office 2002–2008
- Preceded by: David L. Levin
- Succeeded by: Michele Kratky

Personal details
- Born: July 7, 1942 (age 84) St. Louis, Missouri
- Party: Democratic
- Spouse: Michele
- Children: four
- Profession: Real Estate Broker

Fred Kratky (born July 7, 1942) is an American politician. He was a member of the Missouri House of Representatives, having served from 2002 to 2008. He is a member of the Democratic party.
