= Russell Goward =

American politician, real estate broker, and teacher

Russell Goward (August 25, 1935 – July 28, 2007) was an American real estate broker, math teacher, and Democratic politician who served in the Missouri House of Representatives. Born in St. Louis, Missouri, he was first elected to the Missouri House of Representatives in 1966. He served in the U.S. Navy during the Korean War. Goward was named one of the "Ten Outstanding Legislators in the United States" by Jet magazine.
