= Expanded clay aggregate =

Lightweight aggregate made by heating clay at high temperature in a rotary kiln

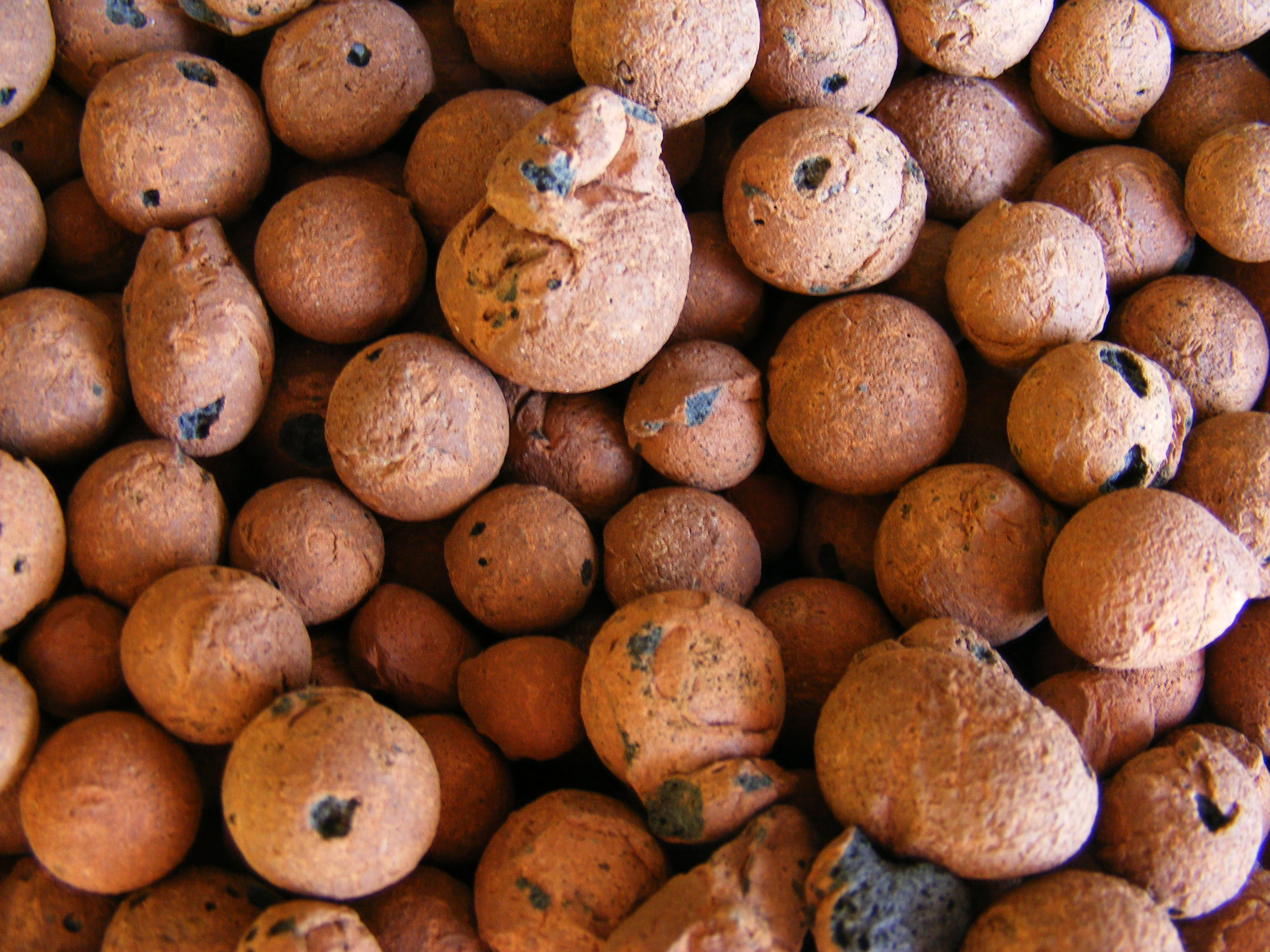
Heat-expanded lightweight pebbles

Expanded clay (exclay) or lightweight expanded clay aggregate (LECA) is a lightweight aggregate made by heating clay to around 1,200 °C (2,190 °F) in a rotary kiln. The heating process causes gases trapped in the clay to expand, forming thousands of small bubbles and giving the material a porous structure. LECA has an approximately round or oblong shape due to circular movement in the kiln and is available in different sizes and densities. LECA is used to make lightweight concrete products and other uses.

== History ==
LECA was developed in Kansas City, Missouri around 1917, produced in a rotary kiln following the method from a patented expanded aggregate known as haydite (which was used in the construction of SS Selma, an ocean-going ship launched in 1919). Following this, a series of aggregates known as gravelite, perlite, rocklite, etc. were developed in the US.

Afterwards, it was expanded to Europe as first started production in Denmark (Copenhagen and later in Røsnæs), Finland, Germany, Holland (the Netherlands) and the UK.

== Characteristics ==
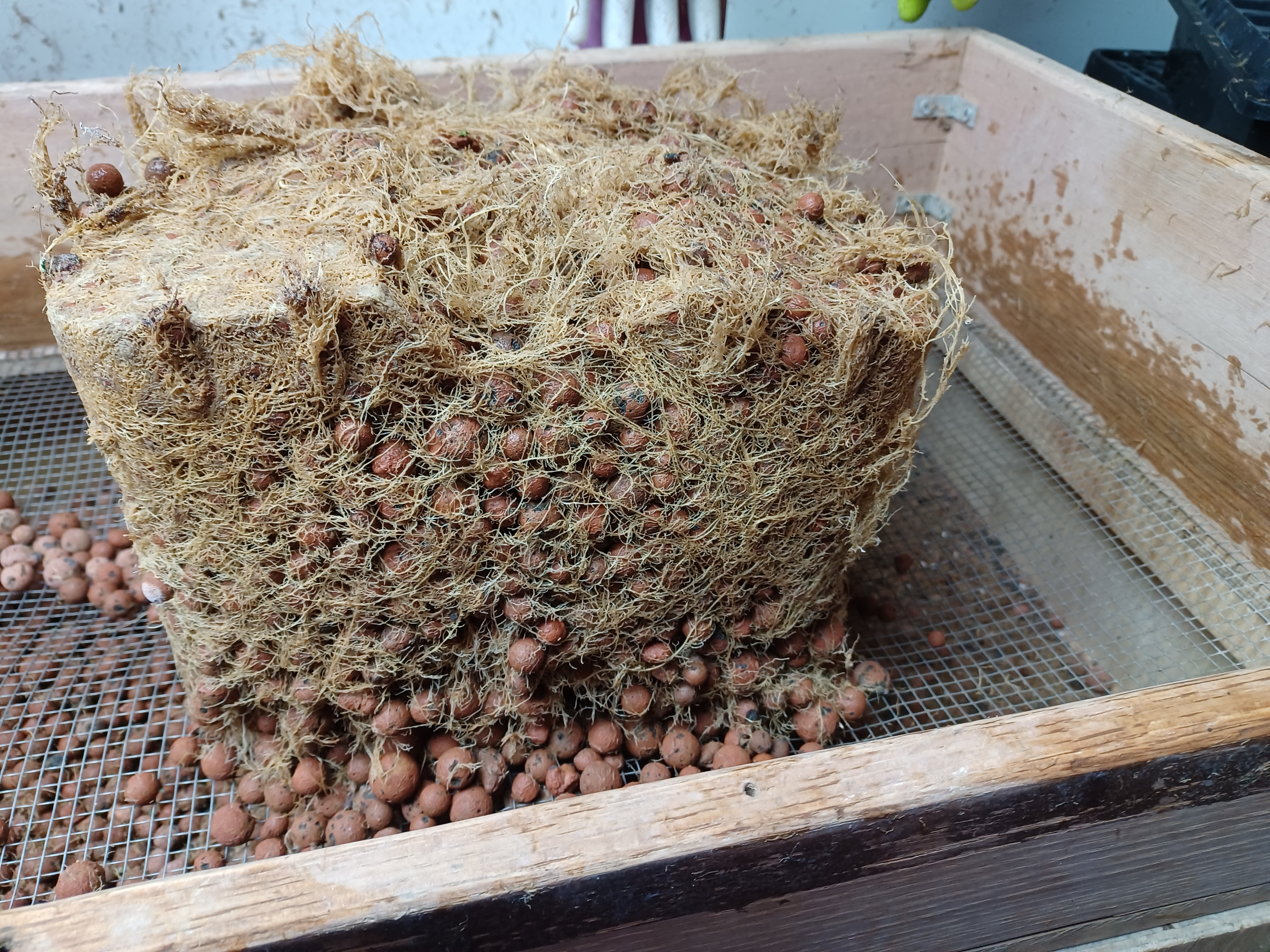
Root ball of a hydroponically-grown cannabis plant with aggregate embedded in it

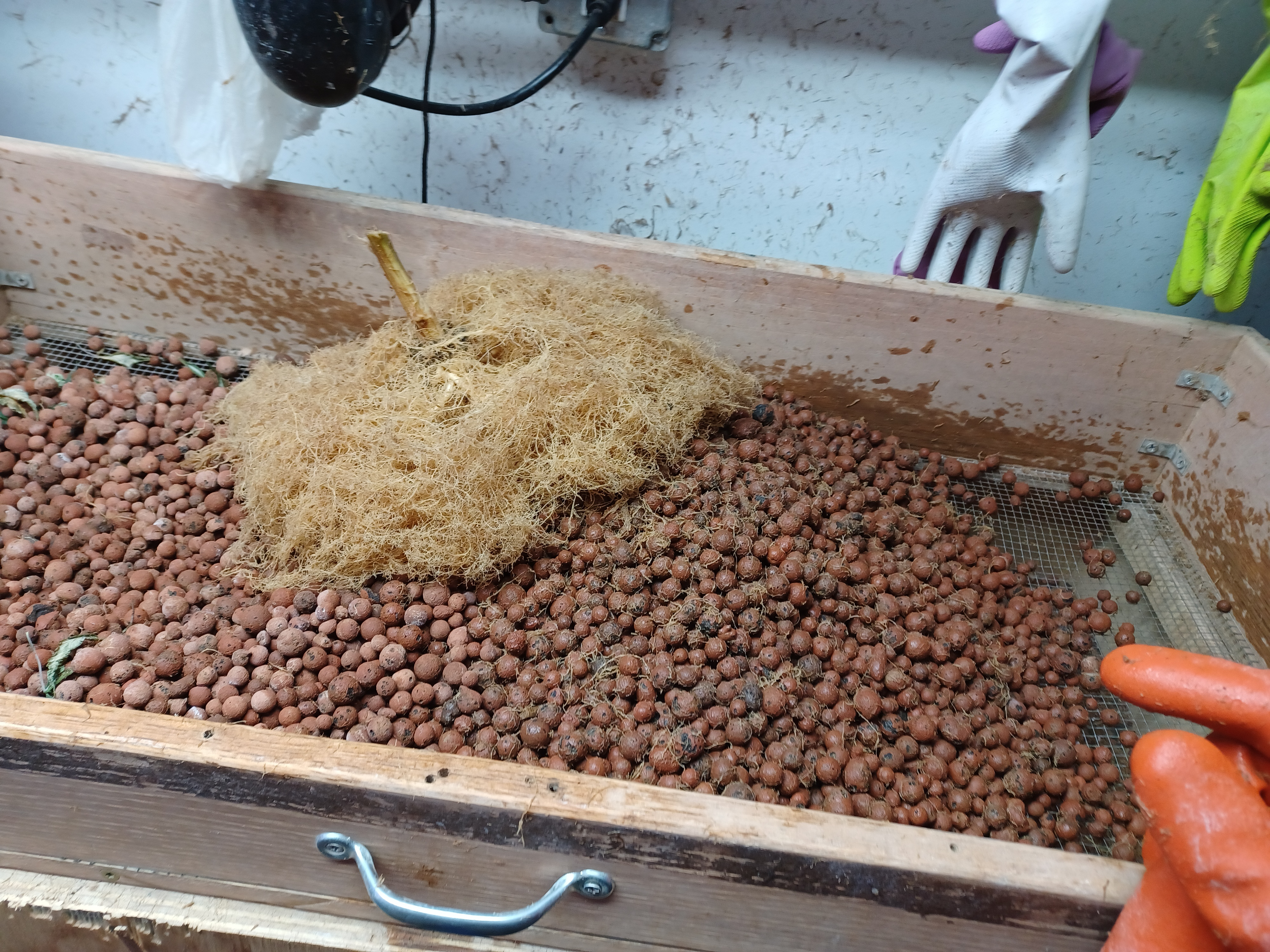
Cleaned root ball and main stem sitting atop the total amount of aggregate used to grow a single plant

LECA is usually produced in different sizes and densities from 0.1 millimetres (0.004 in) up to 25 millimetres (1.0 in), commonly 0–4 mm, 4–10 mm, 10–25 mm and densities of 250, 280, 330, and 510 kg/m^{3}. LECA boulder is the biggest size of LECA with 100–500 mm size and 500 kg/m^{3} density.

Some characteristics of LECA are lightness, thermal insulation by low thermal conductivity coefficient (as low as 0.097 W/mK), soundproofing by high acoustic insulation, moisture impermeability, being incompressible under permanent pressure and gravity loads, not decomposing in severe conditions, fire resistance, a pH of nearly 7, freezing and melting resistance, easy movement and transportation, lightweight backfill and finishing, reduction of construction dead load and earthquake lateral load, being perfect sweet soil for plants, and as a material for drainage and filtration.

== Uses ==
Common uses are in concrete blocks, concrete slabs, geotechnical fillings, lightweight concrete, water treatment, hydroponics, aquaponics and hydroculture.

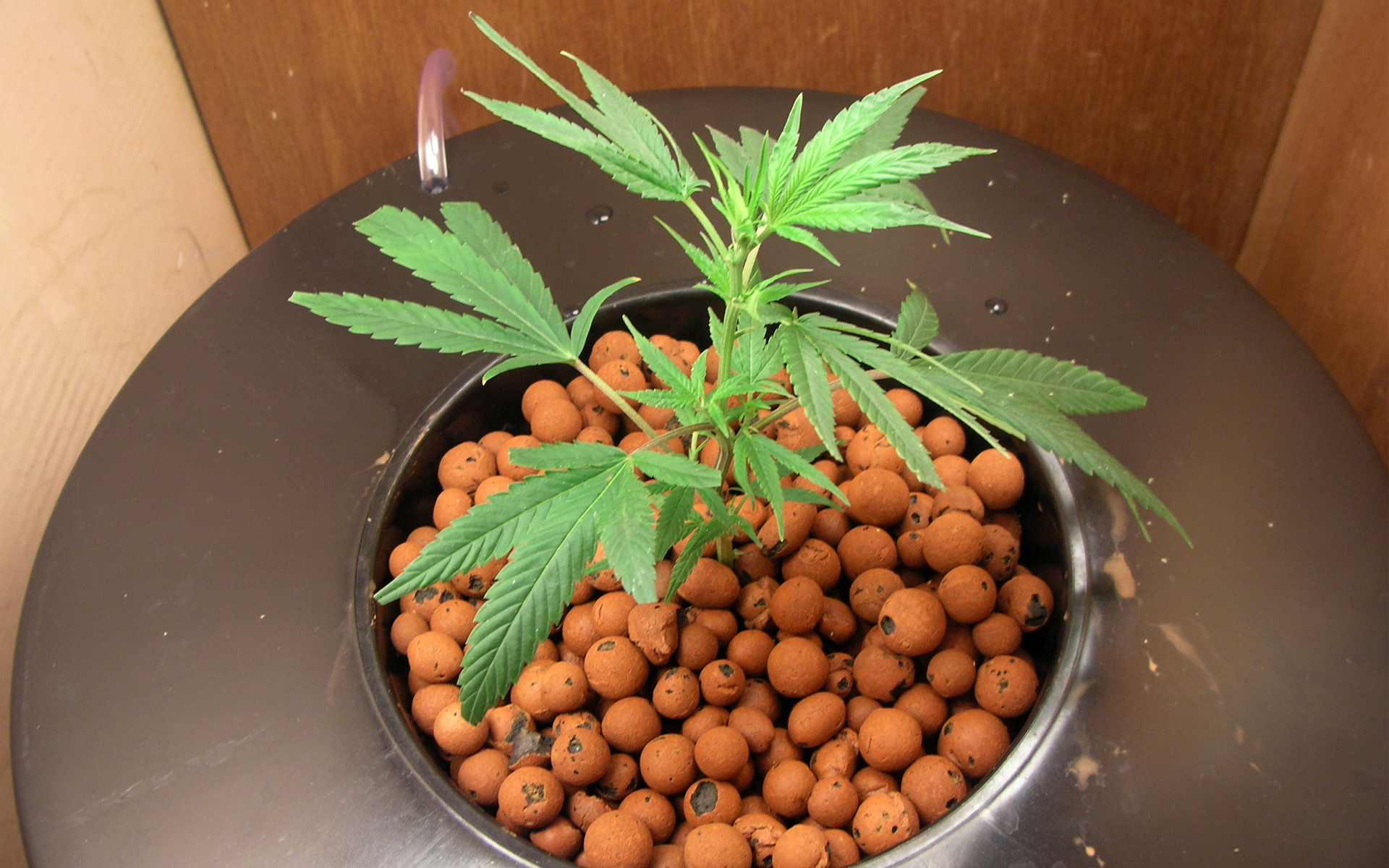
LECA can be easily used for plant-growing substrate.

LECA is a versatile material and is utilized in an increasing number of applications. In the construction industry, it is used extensively in the production of lightweight concrete, blocks and precast or incast structural elements (panels, partitions, bricks and light tiles). LECA used in structural backfill against foundations, retaining walls, bridge abutments etc., in addition, it can reduce earth pressure by 75% compared with conventional materials, and also increases ground stability while reducing settlement and land deformation. LECA can drain the surface water and groundwater to control groundwater pressure. LECA grout can be used for flooring (finishing) and roofing with thermal and sound insulation.

LECA is also used in water treatment facilities for the filtration and purification of municipal wastewater and drinking water as well as in other filtering processes, including those for dealing with industrial wastewater and fish farms.

LECA has many uses in horticulture, agriculture, and landscapes. Using LECA helps to alter soil mechanics. It is commonly used as a growing medium in hydroponics systems since blended with other growing mediums such as soil and peat, it can improve compaction resistance, and drainage, retain water during periods of drought, insulate roots during frost, and provide roots with increased oxygen levels promoting very vigorous growth. LECA can be mixed with heavy soil to improve its aeration and drainage.

In the horticultural practice of hydroponics, LECA is a favored medium for growing plants within; the round shape provides excellent aeration at the root level, while the LECA clay pieces themselves become saturated with water and plant food, thus giving the roots a consistent supply of both. So-called semi-hydroponics or passive hydroponics (also called "semi-hydro") is a popular, simplified method of hydroponics, most commonly utilized for houseplants and tropical species. A plant is potted in solely LECA (preferably in a container with multiple air holes on the sides and bottom, like an orchid pot) and placed into a second, sealed container, in which a "nutrient reservoir" of water and plant food is maintained. Only the very bottom of the pot needs to touch this reservoir; the LECA, being porous by nature, gradually wicks moisture and nutrients up and becomes saturated, allowing the plant to feed and drink at a consistent rate.

One of the main differences between semi-hydroponics and more advanced hydroponics is the nutrients and water—whether they are consistently being delivered or whether they are sitting beneath each plant, gradually needing to be replaced before evaporating or becoming stagnant. Other differences are elements such as the facilities, the equipment, the types of plants being grown and why, and the consistency of water and nutrient delivery. Hydroponics is often favored by farmers and growers of edible crops on a larger scale. LECA can be used successfully in these settings. Semi-hydroponics is much more popular with individual plant collectors, bearing in mind the need to flush out and replenish the plants' nutrient reservoirs periodically (around every 7–10 days); more advanced systems provide constantly flowing, filtered, nutrient-enhanced water over the plants' roots, which typically drains into another reservoir for recycling and reusing.

== See also ==
- Aggregate (composite)
- Vermiculite
