= List of Colorado State University people =

List of some notable people associated with Colorado State University

Coordinates: 40.5762°N 105.0808°W

Location of Colorado State University in Colorado

This is a list of some notable people associated with Colorado State University, located in Fort Collins, Colorado, United States.

The Colorado State University Fact Book, 2007–2008 reported that CSU had 169,935 living alumni, with fifty active alumni chapters (fourteen in Colorado and thirty-seven out of state) and nine national interest groups. CSU graduates include Pulitzer Prize winners, astronauts, chief executive officers, and two former governors of Colorado.

== Arts, sciences, academia and literature ==
- Fred Anderson, American historian, held fellowships from John Simon Guggenheim Memorial Foundation
- Nicole Anona Banowetz, artist and sculptor
- Alicia Bertone, ENGIE-Axium Endowed Dean's Chair of the Graduate School at Ohio State University
- Baxter Black, cowboy poet
- Paul Broadie, president of Housatonic Community College and Gateway Community College
- Mary L. Cleave, astronaut
- Sean Colgan, medical researcher
- Paul J. Crutzen, Dutch meteorologist and atmospheric chemist, 1995 Nobel Prize in Chemistry, former adjunct professor at Colorado State University
- Martin J. Fettman, astronaut
- Edward Harwood, aeroponics inventor
- John Gill, mathematician and father of modern bouldering
- Garry Gross, fashion photographer known for his dog portraiture and work with model and actress Brooke Shields
- Michael Johnson, country and folk singer-songwriter
- Yusef Komunyakaa (MA '81), Pulitzer Prize-winning poet
- Anne LaBastille, author, ecologist, and photographer; 1974 World Wildlife Fund Gold Medal for Conservation, 2008 Lifetime Achievement Award Adirondack Literary Awards, 2008 Howard Zahniser Adirondack Award given by the Association for the Protection of the Adirondacks, known for The Woodswoman series
- Kjell N. Lindgren, astronaut
- Susan Lowdermilk, artist, printmaker
- George Marsaglia, computer scientist
- Mark Mattson, neuroscientist
- Nancy E. McIntyre, ecologist and academic
- Jürgen Mulert, economist, Fulbright scholar, founder of the German Fulbright Alumni Association
- Grace Espy Patton (1896–1904), Colorado state superintendent of schools; professor, Colorado Agricultural College
- J. Wayne Reitz, fifth president of the University of Florida (1955–1967)
- Kent Rominger ('78), former NASA astronaut and shuttle commander
- Jon Rubinstein, computer scientist, member of National Academy of Engineering, helped create the iPod, iMac
- Saleem (Saleem Azzouqa), Palestinian-American gay Muslim playwright, actor, DJ, and dancer
- Rebecca Skloot, science writer, author of The Immortal Life of Henrietta Lacks
- George E. Staples, veterinary researcher and animal nutrition pioneer
- Steven D. Tanksley, chief technology officer of Nature Source Improved Plants, professor emeritus at Cornell University, member of the National Academy of Sciences, Wolf Prize and Japan Prize laureate
- Harlan Thomas, Seattle architect
- James Van Hoften, astronaut
- Frank Alan Ward, Distinguished Professor in the College of Agriculture, Consumer, and Environmental Science; 2022 DARE Hall of Fame Award, Colorado State University: Lifetime Achievement Award, 2022

== Entertainment and media ==
=== Reporters and journalists ===
- Eugene Daniels (BA '12), White House correspondent and Playbook author

=== Cinema and television ===
- John Amos, actor
- Keith Carradine, Academy Award-winning actor
- Dominique Dunne, actress
- Leslie Jones, actress and comedian
- Willow Patterson, drag queen and winner of RuPaul's Drag Race season 14
- Derek Theler, actor in Baby Daddy

=== Musicians ===
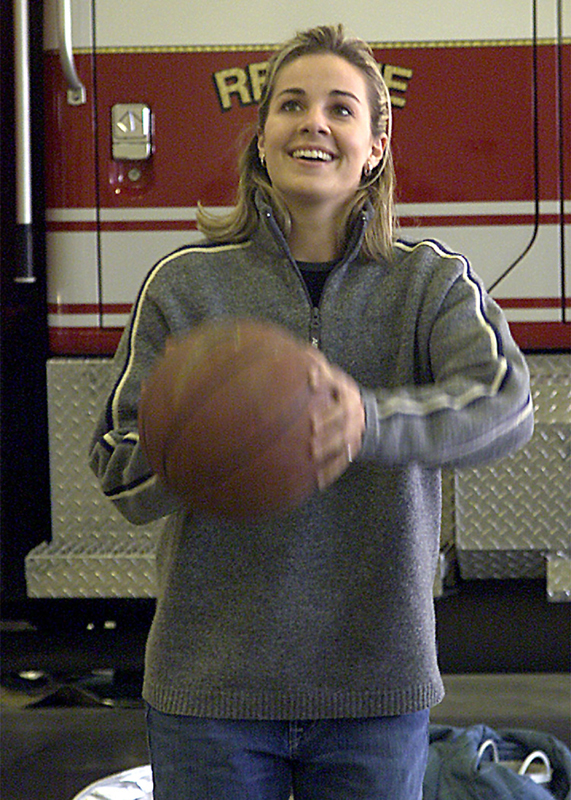
Becky Hammon

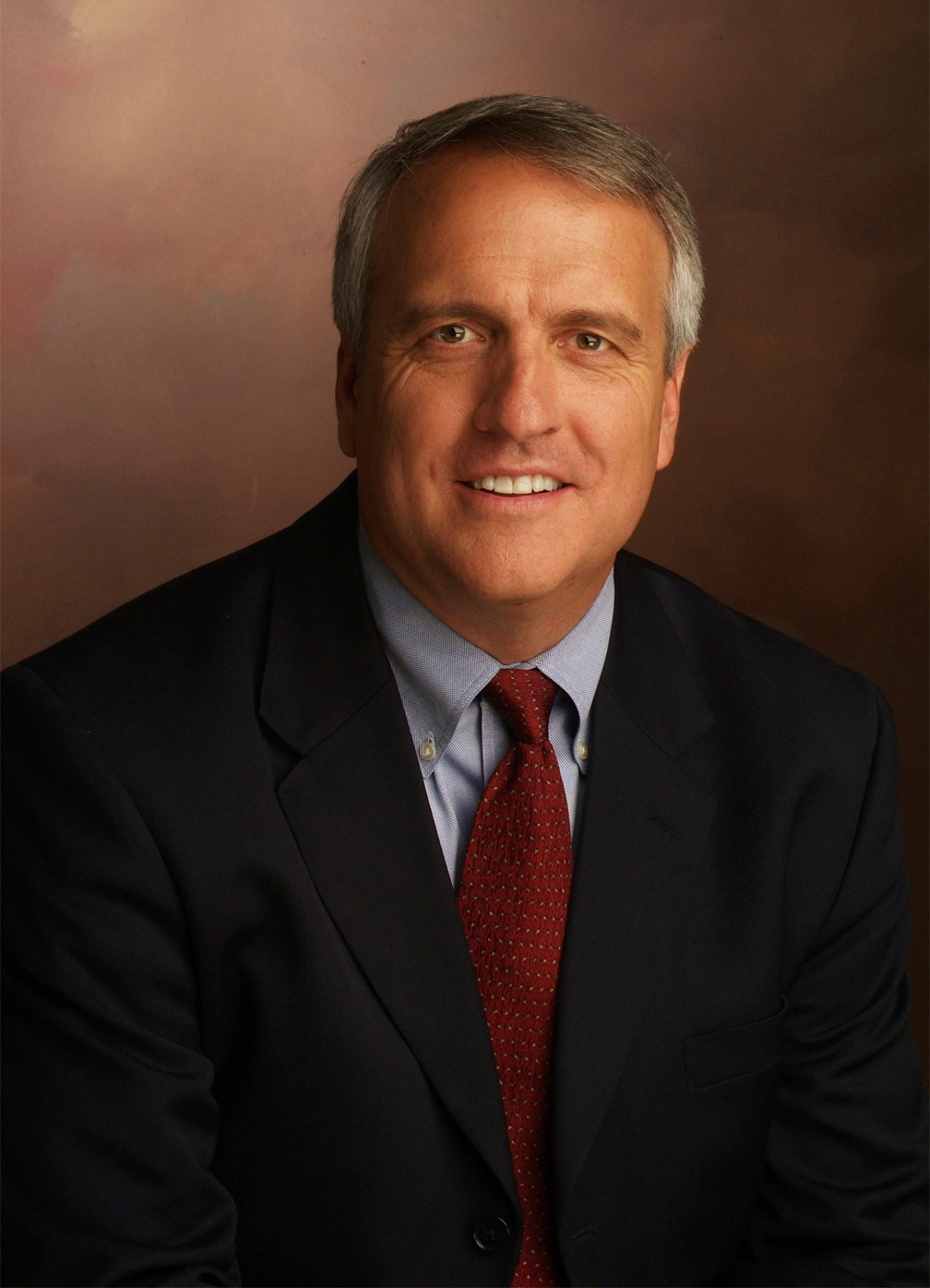
Bill Ritter

- Henson Cargill, country music singer, known for "Skip a Rope"

=== Vloggers ===
- Paul Ray Ramsey, far-right vlogger, YouTube personality, and public speaker

== Athletics ==
- David Anderson, NFL professional football player
- Al "Bubba" Baker, NFL professional football player
- Shaquil Barrett, professional football player, two-time Super Bowl winner, Second-Team All-Pro 2019
- Randy Beverly, NFL professional football player
- Kapri Bibbs, NFL professional football player
- Sam Brunelli, professional football player
- Susan Butcher, dogsled racer
- Nico Carvacho (born 1997), basketball player in the Israeli Basketball Premier League
- Jack Christiansen, professional football player
- David Cohn (born 1995), professional basketball player
- Jim David, professional football player
- Joel Dreessen, former NFL player
- Steve Fairchild, college and professional football coach
- Sherwood Fries, professional football player
- Donovan Gans, professional football player
- Crockett Gillmore, professional football player
- Garrett Grayson, professional football player
- Clark Haggans, professional football player
- Becky Hammon, professional basketball coach
- Caleb Hanie, professional football player
- John Howell, professional football player
- Colton Iverson (born 1989), professional basketball player
- Selwyn Jones, professional football player
- Brady Keys, professional football player and businessman
- Stanton Kidd (born 1992), professional basketball player
- Mark Knudson, professional baseball player
- Martin Laird, professional golfer
- Keith Lee, professional football player
- Kim Lyons, athlete and personal trainer on The Biggest Loser
- Jim Malloy, professional racecar driver
- Trey McBride, NFL player for Arizona Cardinals
- Lawrence McCutcheon, professional football player
- Kevin McDougal, professional football player
- Thurman "Fum" McGraw, professional football player
- Keli McGregor, president of the Colorado Rockies and professional football player
- Kevin McLain, professional football player
- Kim Mestdagh, Belgian professional basketball player, WNBA champion 2019, EuroBasket Women bronze medalist in 2017 and 2021, now playing for PF Schio
- Scooter Molander, professional football player
- Mike Montgomery, professional basketball coach
- Sean Moran, professional football player
- Glenn Morris, 1935, gold medal winner in the 1936 Olympics in Berlin
- Clint Oldenburg, professional football player
- Milt Palacio, professional basketball player
- Erik Pears, professional football player
- Erin Popovich, three-time United States Paralympic swimmer, has won 14 Paralympic gold medals, and 19 medals total
- Joey Porter, professional football player, member of 2006 Super Bowl champion Pittsburgh Steelers
- Bill Quayle, athletics director for Emporia State University 1979–1999
- Weston Richburg, former NFL player for New York Giants and San Francisco 49ers
- David Roddy, NBA professional basketball player
- Rachael Rudel, distance runner
- Bob Rule, NBA professional basketball player
- Ty Sambrailo, professional football player
- Bailey Santistevan, legendary coach
- Brady Smith, professional football player
- Jason Smith, NBA aprofessional basketball player
- Janay DeLoach Soukup, 2012 Summer Olympic bronze medalist in women's long jump
- Andre Strode, professional football player
- Amy Van Dyken, Olympic swimmer and gold medalist
- Bradlee Van Pelt, NFL professional football player

== Politics ==
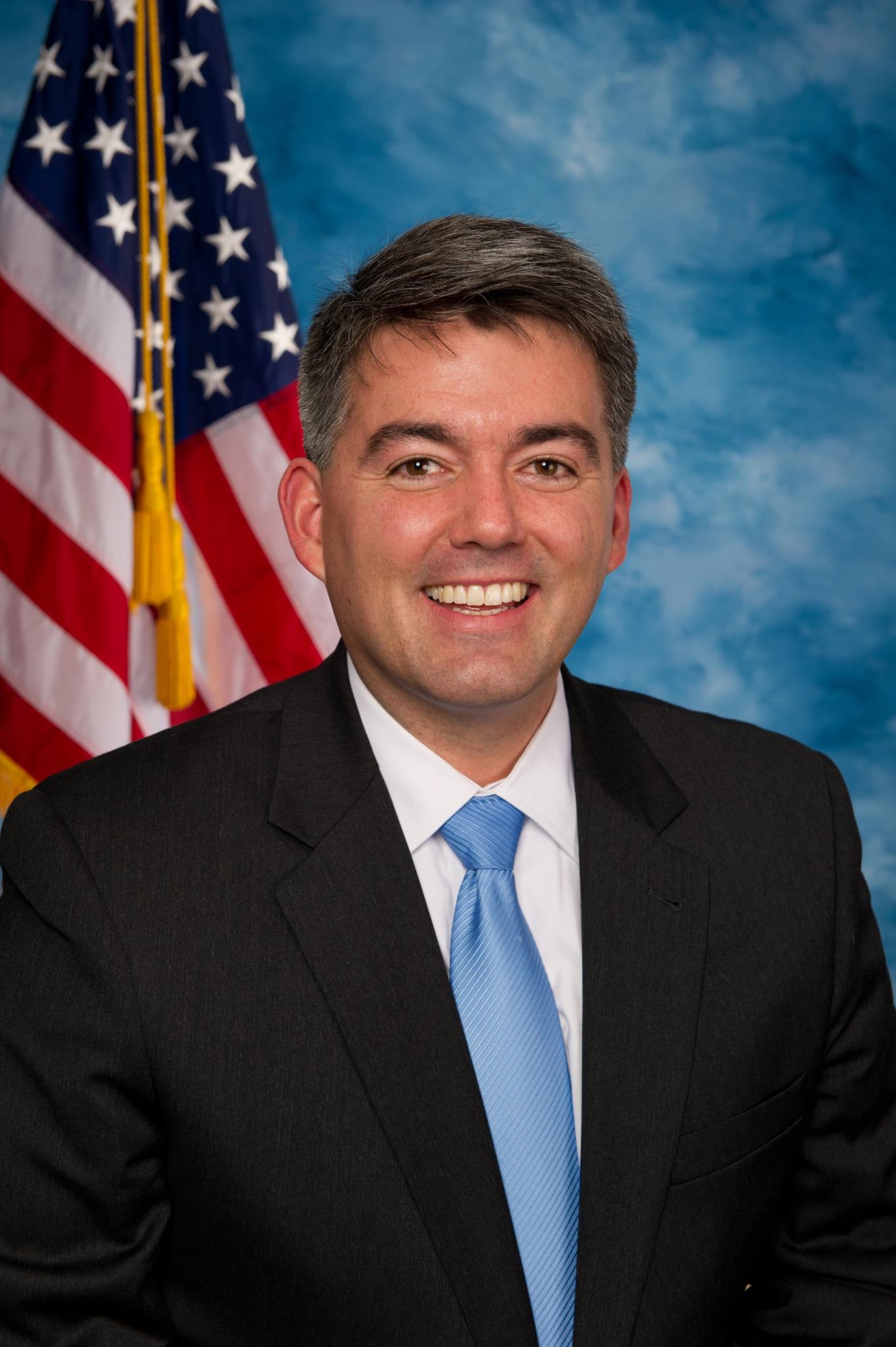
Cory Gardner

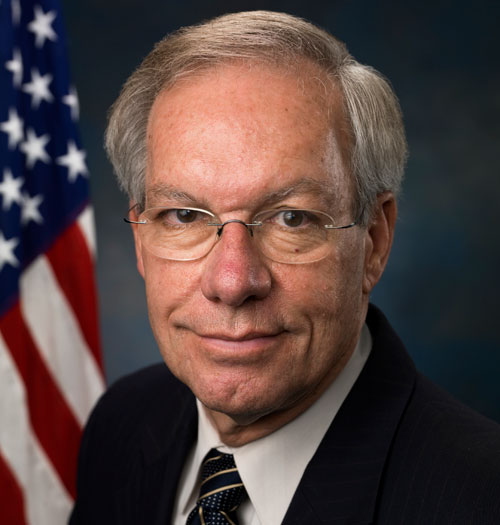
Wayne Allard

- Wayne Allard, United States senator from Colorado (1997–2009)
- David Asay, former Republican member of the Wyoming House of Representatives
- Ibrahim Abdulaziz Al-Assaf, Finance Minister, Saudi Arabia
- Anwar al-Awlaki, Yemeni-American imam and reputed Al-Qaeda terrorist; first American citizen to be targeted and killed by a U.S. drone strike
- Benny Begin, PhD in geology, Israeli politician, Knesset member and minister
- Mohammed Ali Beshr, Egyptian politician
- Greg Brophy, Republican member of the Colorado Senate
- Jeff Crank, United States representative from Colorado's 5th district
- Les Eaves (Business Management), Republican member of the Arkansas House of Representatives for White County
- John Ensign, former United States senator from Nevada
- Cory Gardner, Republican U.S. senator from Colorado
- Basuki Hadimuljono, Indonesian Minister of Public Works and Public Housing
- Jim Hawkes (PhD in psychology, 1970), Canadian politician
- Paula Hicks-Hudson, lawyer, member of the Ohio State Senate, former Toledo City Council president and acting mayor
- Hsu Shu-hsiang
- Doug Hutchinson, former mayor of Fort Collins, Colorado
- Conway LeBleu, attended late 1940s, did not graduate, native of Lake Charles, Louisiana, represented Calcasieu and Cameron parishes in the Louisiana House of Representatives 1964–1988
- Mousa Abu Marzook, Hamas member
- Stan Matsunaka, politician
- Marilyn Musgrave, former Republican member of the United States House of Representatives
- Angie Paccione, politician
- Bill Ritter, governor of Colorado, former Denver District Attorney
- Roy R. Romer, former Colorado governor
- Brian Schweitzer, 23rd governor of Montana
- Ismail Abu Shanab, Hamas founder
- Sam Steiger, member of the U.S. House of Representatives, former mayor of Prescott, Arizona
- Carol Voisin, ethics professor and former candidate for Congress
- Dwight A. York, politician
- Dave Young, treasurer of Colorado, former member of the Colorado House of Representatives
- Isabel Brown (American activist), conservative political activist, media personality, political commentator, and author

== Business ==
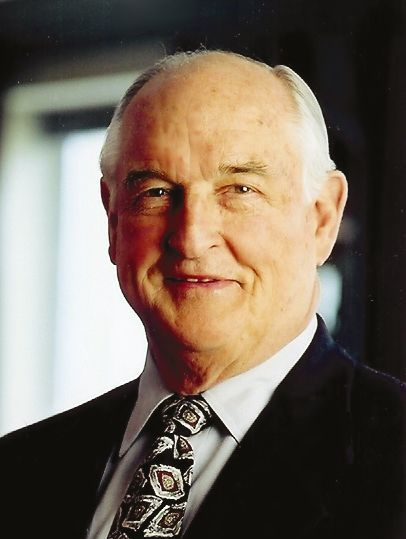
Walter Scott Jr.

- Bonnie Ross, corporate vice president at Xbox Game Studio, founder and former head of 343 Industries, known for developing Halo series
- Walter Scott, Jr., former CEO of Peter Kiewit Sons' Incorporated, Level 3 Communications; Berkshire Hathaway chairman
- Andrew Wirth, businessman, CEO of Palisades Tahoe

== Military and intelligence agencies ==
- William E. Adams, former major in the United States Army, recipient of the Medal of Honor
- Roger A. Brady, United States Air Force four-star general, served as commander of U.S. Air Forces in Europe
- Sabrina Bruce, non-commissioned officer in the United States Space Force
- James H. Dickinson, commander, United States Space Command
- Salvatore Augustine Giunta, former staff sergeant in the United States Army, recipient of the Medal of Honor
- Dee Mewbourne, retired United States Navy vice admiral, 16th deputy commander of United States Transportation Command
- Barbara Robbins, first female CIA employee to die in action in the agency's history
- Scott Sherman, United States Army National Guard major general
- Ralph C. Smith, senior officer of the United States Army, decorated with the Legion of Merit for his service in World War II
- Lew Walt, decorated U.S. Marine
- George Watson, private in U.S. Army, earned a Medal of Honor in World War II

== Notable faculty ==
- Maurice Albertson, civil engineer, Peace Corps co-founder
- Theodosia Grace Ammons, president, Colorado Equal Suffrage Association
- Raj Chandra Bose, statistician
- Louis George Carpenter, irrigation engineer and first dean of Engineering & Physics
- Henry P. Caulfield, Jr., political scientist
- Howard Ensign Evans, entomologist
- Elnora M. Gilfoyle, dean of the College of Applied Human Sciences (1989–1991), provost/academic vice president (1991–1995)
- Temple Grandin, animal scientist
- William M. Gray, atmospheric scientist
- Albert Meyers, organic chemist, member of National Academy of Sciences, known for Meyers synthesis
- Rachel Justine Pries, mathematician, fellow of the American Mathematical Society
- Robin Reid, environmental scientist and member of the team who established the International Livestock Research Institute
- Bernard Rollin, animal ethics advocate
- Holmes Rolston III, father of environmental ethics
- Ronald M. Sega, systems engineer
- Steve Simske, systems engineer
- Jamuna Sharan Singh, ecologist, faculty (1971–74, 1981–82 and 1993–94), Shanti Swarup Bhatnagar Prize recipient
- Michael F. Steger, social psychologist
- Holly Stein, geologist
- John Kenneth Stille, chemist, known for the Stille reaction, thought to have been a likely candidate for the Nobel Prize in Chemistry before his death
- Thomas Sutherland, former hostage in Lebanon
- Bryan Willson, mechanical engineer
- Branislav Notaros, electrical engineer

== Presidents ==
The following persons have served as president of Colorado State University:

No.	Image	President	Term start	Term end	Ref.
Presidents of Colorado Agricultural College (1870–1935)
1		Elijah Evans Edwards	1879	1882	
2		Charles L. Ingersoll	1882	1891	
interim		James W. Lawrence	1891	1892	
3		Alston Ellis	1892	1899	
4		Barton O. Aylesworth	1899	1909	
Presidents of Colorado State College of Agriculture and Mechanic Arts (1935–1950)
5		Charles A. Lory	1909	1940	
6		Roy M. Green	1940	1948 (Note: Died in office)	
7		Isaac E. Newsom	1948	1949	
Presidents of Colorado Agricultural and Mechanical College (1950–1957)
8		William E. Morgan	1949	1969	
Presidents of Colorado State University (1957–present)
9		Adrian R. Chamberlain	1969	1979	
10		Ralph E. Christoffersen	1981	1983	
11		Philip E. Austin	1984	1989 (Note: Resigned to head the University of Alabama system)	
interim		Judson M. Harper	August 15, 1989	June 30, 1990	
12		Albert C. Yates	July 1, 1990	July 31, 2003	
13		Larry Edward Penley	August 1, 2003	November 30, 2008	
interim		Tony Frank	December 1, 2008	June 30, 2009	
14		Tony Frank	July 1, 2009	June 30, 2019 (Note: Resigned to head the three-campus Colorado State University System)	
15		Joyce McConnell	July 1, 2019	June 30, 2022	
interim		Rick Miranda	July 1, 2022	January 31, 2023	
16		Amy Parsons	February 1, 2023	present	

Table notes:

== See also ==
- List of colleges and universities in Colorado
- Bibliography of Colorado
- Geography of Colorado
- History of Colorado
- Index of Colorado-related articles
- List of Colorado-related lists
- Outline of Colorado
