= Suderbyn Ecovillage =

Sustainable intentional community in Sweden focusing on permaculture and eco-projects

Suderbyn Ecovillage is an experimental intentional community based on the island Gotland in Sweden, south of Visby. The project’s main purpose is to live a sustainable lifestyle as an ecovillage. Although preparations were done in 2006 and 2007, in July 2008 Suderbyn Ecovillage started officially and developed to Suderbyn Permaculture Ecovillage and NGO Relearn. Several ecological techniques such as permaculture are central and social projects as well as festivals have been organized on the property. For example, the No More War Festival was held from 17 to 20 August 2017. There is a big focus on sustainability and environmentalism. Suderbyn provides an educational model for environmentally-friendly accommodation, wastewater treatment, food and energy production. Their main language is English.

== Beginnings ==
In 2008, the Swedish Ingrid Gustafsson and her American ex-husband Robert Hall bought an old farm across the street from an inactive military area. After years of working for international development for the UN in South Asia, Middle America and Eastern Europe they landed on Gotland with their family. They needed more stability but keep the spirit, diversity and new encounters. During their wanderings they had been in many ecovillages.

== Closed Loop Project ==
Several eco projects are run by NGO Relearn on Suderbyn Ecovillage. For example the Closed Loop Project. This project has three components. The first is a geodesic dome greenhouse that contains a set of low impact technologies for heating, energy supply, insulation, ventilation and rainwater collection. The second component is a biogas digester. The third component is an aeroponics system.
