= AeroFarms =

Sustainable indoor agriculture company

- Industry: Agriculture
- Founded: 2004; 22 years ago in Finger Lakes, New York, U.S.
- Headquarters: Danville, Virginia, U.S.
- Key people: Molly Montgomery (Exec Chair & CEO)
- Products: Microgreens
- Website: aerofarms.com

AeroFarms is a sustainable indoor agriculture company based in Danville, VA and uses a patented aeroponic growing system to grow produce.

== History ==
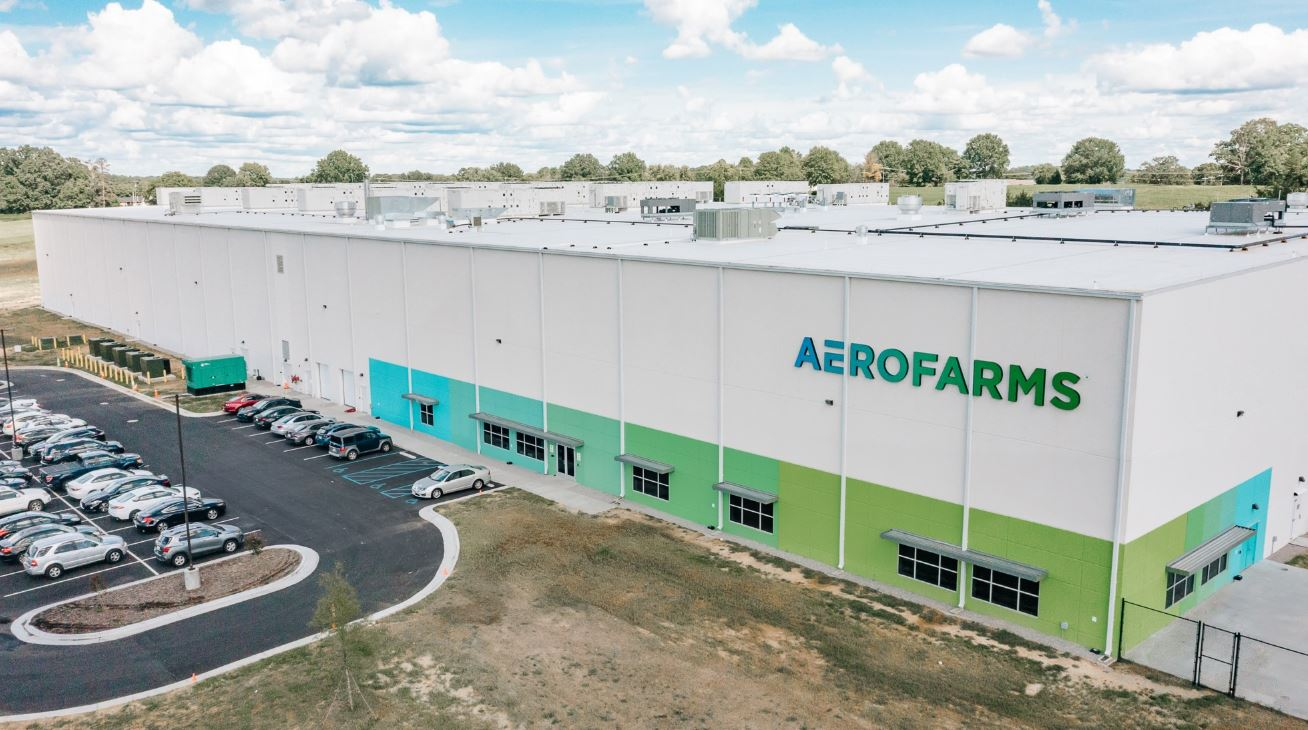
AeroFarms Danville, Virginia Farm

AeroFarms began in 2004 in the Finger Lakes area of New York. In 2015, the company relocated its headquarters to Newark, New Jersey. The company was co-founded by CEO David Rosenberg, CMO Marc Oshima, and CSO Edward Harwood.

In 2015, AeroFarms started a growing space in a 30,000 square-foot former paintball and laser tag arena in Newark, New Jersey.

In September 2016, the AeroFarms Global Headquarters opened in a 70,000 square-foot facility in Newark, which is the largest indoor vertical farm in the world based on annual growing capacity. The farm was built in a 75-year-old former steel mill facility and has the capacity to produce up to two million pounds of leafy greens per year.

In 2022, AeroFarms opened a farm in Danville, Virginia, where the company is now headquartered.

On June 8, 2023, AeroFarms filed for Chapter 11 bankruptcy. AeroFarms emerged from its bankruptcy in September 2023 following the court's approval of its restructuring plan involving major investors such as Grosvenor Food & AgTech and Doha Venture Capital, and stated that it was once again nearing profitability. The company has ceased spending on all of its projects excluding its Danville farm as part of its post-bankruptcy turnaround plan.

== Post-Bankruptcy ==
In 2023, AeroFarms named Molly Montgomery acting CEO and Executive Chair and assembled a seasoned team of agriculture experts to help lead and grow the company.

Over the course of 2024, AeroFarms continued to expand its microgreens availability into retail grocers across the U.S., including a partnership with Costco. In January 2025, AeroFarms announced the commercialization of its patented vertical farming system.

AeroFarms is the leading U.S. provider of microgreens, commanding over 70% of the retail market share.

== Product ==
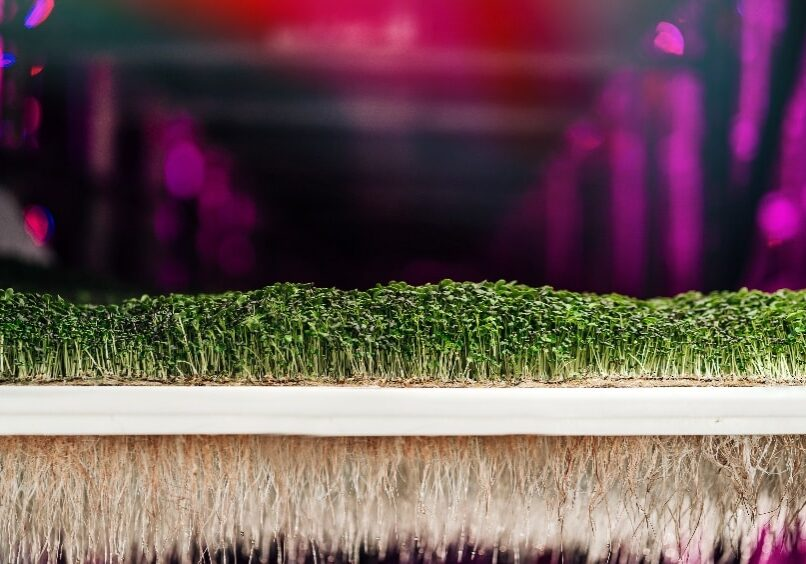
Aerofarms Microgreens

AeroFarms microgreens are available in several varieties across the company's FlavorSpectrum™. These varieties include micro broccoli, micro kale, micro bok choy, micro rainbow mix, micro wasabi mustard, micro spicy mix, and micro super mix.

Microgreens have a robust flavor and are highly nutritious, offering 5x to 40x the phytonutrients of their mature vegetable counterpart.

AeroFarms microgreens are grown without pesticides and offered in a resealable, ready-to-eat, no-wash-required format.

AeroFarms uses modern sustainable agriculture technology including patented aeroponics, automated conveyance systems, robotics, and AI.

AeroFarms uses 100% renewable energy and is climate-agnostic, growing plants year-round, regardless of geography and weather conditions. Compared to traditional outdoor farming, AeroFarms uses 90% less water and 230x less land. AeroFarms maintains high food quality standards, achieving an SQF score of 100% on its 2024 FDA audit.

AeroFarms is a Certified B Corporation^{19}
