= Lowdermilk =

Lowdermilk is a surname. Notable people with the surname include:

- Bree Lowdermilk, American musical theater composer
- Dwayne Lowdermilk (born 1958), Canadian ice hockey player
- Grover Lowdermilk (1885–1968), American baseball player
- Johnny Lowdermilk (born 1992), American football player
- Kirk Lowdermilk (born 1963), American football player
- Lou Lowdermilk (1887–1975), American baseball player
- Susan Lowdermilk (born 1963), American artist and educator
- Walter C. Lowdermilk (1888–1974), American soil conservationist
- William Harrison Lowdermilk (1839–1897), American soldier

== See also ==
- Loudermilk (disambiguation)
