= Metro Pacific Fresh Farms =

Greenhouse farm complex

- Town/City: San Rafael
- Province: Bulacan
- Country: Philippines
- Coordinates: 15°01′16.6″N 120°58′01.7″E
- Established: 2025
- Owner: Metro Pacific Agro Ventures; LR Group
- Area: 3.5 hectares (8.6 acres)
- Produces: Lettuce; cherry tomatoes; cucumbers; bell peppers

Metro Pacific Fresh Farms (MPFF) is a greenhouse farm complex in San Rafael, Bulacan, Philippines.

== History ==
Metro Pacific Agro Ventures (MPAV), the agriculture arm and subsidiary of Philippine firm Metro Pacific Investments Corporation (MPIC) entered a joint venture with Israeli company LR Group to establish a greenhouse farm in San Rafael, Bulacan. The groundbreaking for the facility which was named Metro Pacific Fresh Farms (MPFF) took place on February 20, 2023. MPFF opened on March 25, 2025.

== Facilities and produce ==
The MPFF covers an area of 3.5 hectares (8.6 acres) in San Rafael, Bulacan and has the capacity to produce 500 metric tons of produce annually. The complex has six greenhouse structures. The farm utilize nutrient film technique and has a drip irrigation system.

The farm markets its produce under the MVP (More Veggies Please) brand. Lettuce is primarily cultivated here, but the farm can also grow cherry tomatoes, cucumbers, and bell peppers.

It also has a nursery which has the capacity to accommodate 100,000 seeds at a time.
