= Asay =

Asay may refer to:

== People ==
- Alma Asay, American co-founder of a legal technology company
- Amanda Asay (1988–2022), Canadian baseball and ice hockey player
- Carlos E. Asay (1926–1999), American general authority
- Chuck Asay (born 1942), American cartoonist
- Daniel V. Asay (1847–1930), American iceboat racer
- David Asay (born 1925), American politician
- Katrina Asay (born 1957), American politician
- Mark Asay (1964–2017), American spree killer

== Places ==
- Asay, Utah, an abandoned town located in Garfield County, Utah
