= Edward Harwood (disambiguation) =

Edward Harwood (1729–1794) was an English scholar and theologian.

Edward Harwood may also refer to:

- Edward Harwood (military officer) (1586–1632), English Puritan soldier
- Edward Harwood (of Darwen) (1707–1787), English composer
- Edward C. Harwood (1900–1980), economist, philosopher of science and investment advisor
- Edward Harwood (American inventor) (born 1950), pioneer of Aeroponics
- Edward Harwood (Virginia politician), 18th century planter and politician in Warwick County, Virginia
