= Loudermilk =

Loudermilk may refer to:

== People ==
- Barry Loudermilk (born 1963), American politician
- Isaiahh Loudermilk (born 1997), American football player
- John D. Loudermilk (1934–2016), American singer-songwriter

== Other uses ==
- Loudermilk (TV series), 2017-2020 American comedy television series starring Ron Livingston
- Gosling (band), American rock band earlier known as Loudermilk
- Loudermilk: Or, The Real Poet; Or, The Origin of the World, 2019 novel by Lucy Ives

== See also ==
- Lowdermilk (disambiguation)
