= Nicole Anona Banowetz =

American artist

- Born: 1981 (age 44–45); Colorado, US
- Education: Colorado State University
- Known for: Sculpture
- Notable work: Vessel, Contagion, Life of a Slime Mold
- Website: http://www.nicolebanowetz.com/

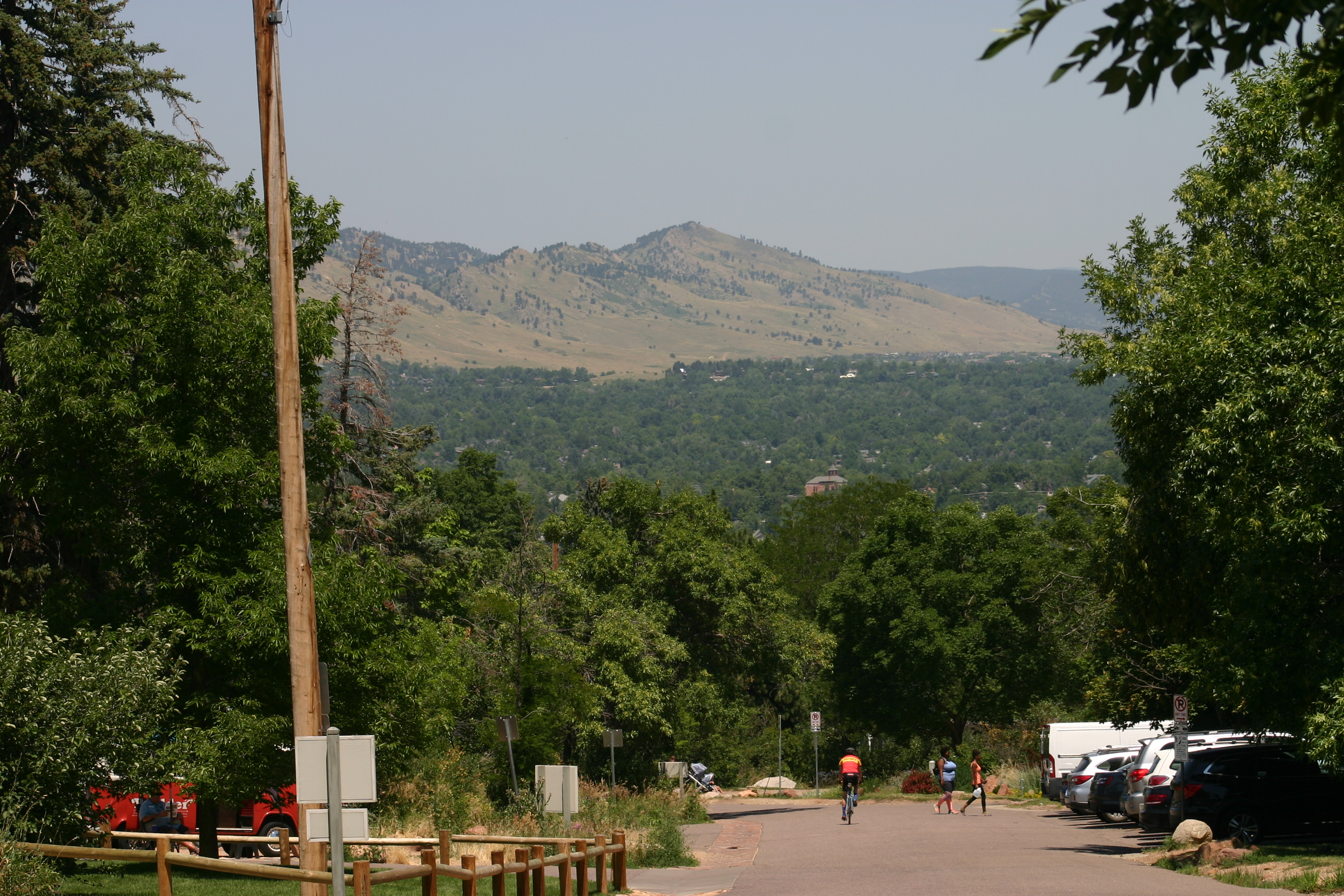
Colorado Mountains where Nicole Banowetz grew up

Nicole Anona Banowetz (born 1981) is a Denver based artist who is known for creating giant inflatable sculpture of microscopic creatures. Her work has been shown internationally appearing in shows in the Netherlands, Russia, Sweden, Taiwan, and Poland. Her works frequently appears at festivals around the world.

== Inflatable sculpture ==
Her sculptures recreate microscopic creatures in large scale floating installations. Inspired by animal, plant, mineral and bacterial worlds, her works deals with themes such as natural growth and decay while evoking feelings of struggle and vulnerability. Powered by large air blowers, the works are changeable and fluid, when refilled they often inflate differently, tilting and sagging in new ways. The sculptures are usually completely white, requiring the viewer to fill in colors with their imagination. In other situations they will be made with colored fabric or filled with colored lights. Sometimes the works can be entered or contain windows for viewing the inside of the sculpture.

== Career ==
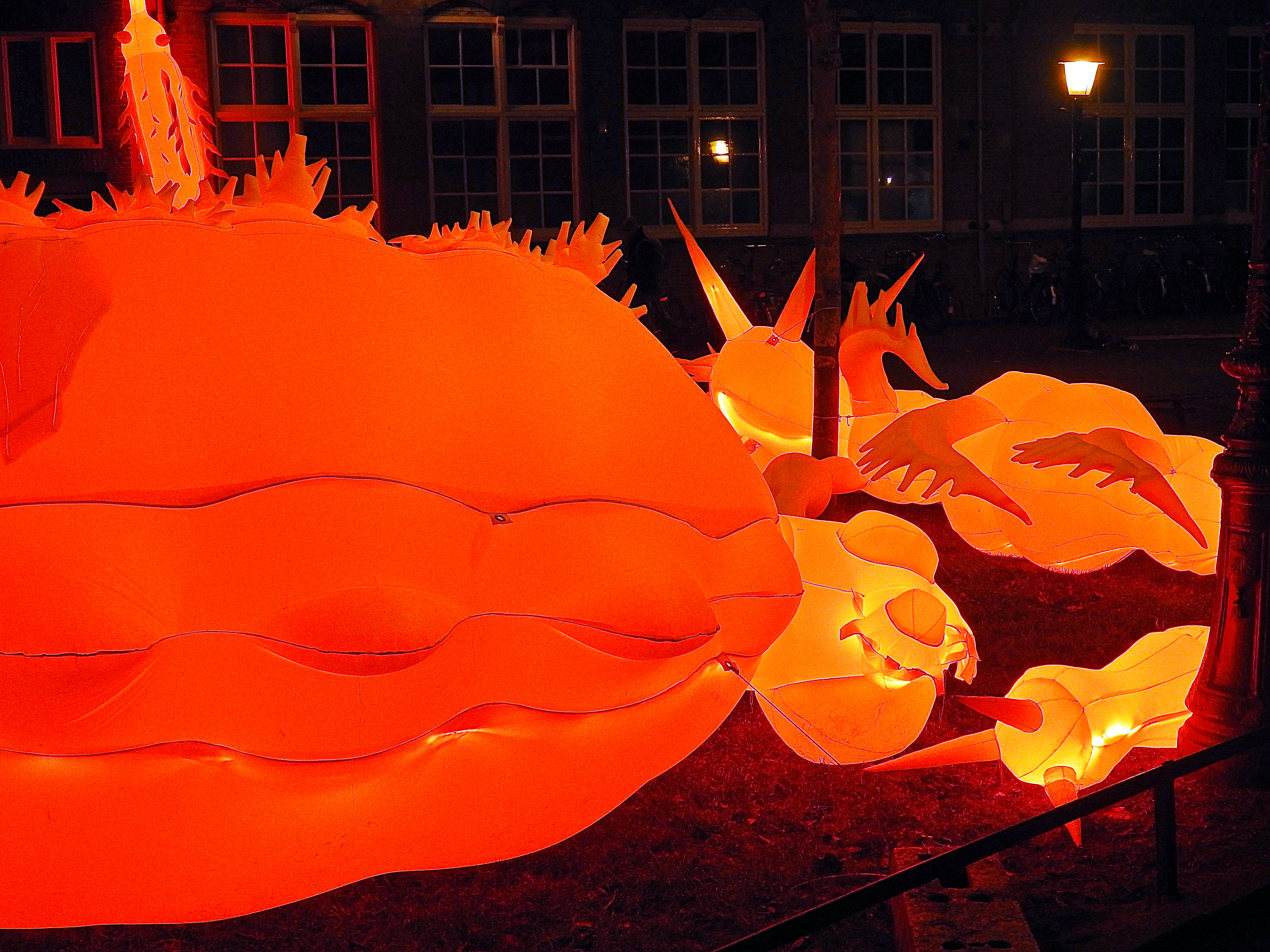
Banowetz's sculpture illuminated by lights at the Amsterdam Light Festival

She is a member of the Denver artist cooperative Pirate: Contemporary Art. She was commissioned to create a large-scale installation in the Denver Zoo. In 2013, Nicole was a participant in the Biennial of the Americas. She spent 2015 conducting artists residencies in Europe, returning in 2016 for a residency at the Children's Museum in Denver. Her work is popular with educational institutions, and is often created in collaboration with Children. In 2017 she worked with students at McMeen Elementary to create an inflatable science fiction utopia. Her work has an element of social practice, and she started her own artist's collective called BAAM, Build Art and Make (the world what you want), the group created an inflatable torch, modeled off the Statue of Liberty. The torch was used to activist marches following the election of President Trump. In 2017, she was named one of 100 Colorado Creatives by Westword Magazine.

== Exhibitions ==
=== Solo ===
- 2019 Erupture. Wonderspaces, Scottsdale, AZ. US.
- 2018-19 Incubation Effect. Denver Art Museum. Denver, CO. US.
- 2018 Being More Than One. Gray Contemporary. Houston, TX. US.
- 2018 A Delicate Nature. SVSU Art Gallery, Saginaw, MI, US.
- 2017 Simulacra Vison. A collaboration with Chris Bagley. Pirate Contemporary Art. Denver, CO. US
- 2016 Gentle Infestation. Pirate Contemporary Art. Denver, CO. US
- 2015 Gentle Infestation. Bałtycka Galeria Sztuki Współczesnej Ustka, Poland.
- 2015 Embrace: The Heavy Petting Gallery. Kreuzburg Pavilion. Berlin, Germany.
- 2015 Being More than One. Institut Fur Alles Mögliche. Berlin, Germany
- 2014 Rhinos and Sea Anemones Fighting. Pirate Contemporary Art. Denver, CO. US
- 2014 Contagion. Museum of Outdoor Arts Glass Gallery. Englewood, CO US.
- 2013 (anti)decay. Pirate Contemporary Art. Denver, CO. US
- 2012 Horses: An inflatable installation. Ironton Gallery. Denver, CO. US

=== Group ===
- 2019 Sculpture Month, The Silos at Sawyer Yards, Houston TX. US.
- 2019 Natura Obscura. Museum of Outdoor Arts. Englewood, CO US
- 2017 OpenART Biennial, Orbero, Sweden
- 2013 Biennial of the Americas, Denver Colorado

=== Residencies ===
- 2016 Children's Museum of Denver
- 2015 Center for Creative Activities in Ustka, Poland
- 2015 NCCA Art Residence, Kronstadt, Russia
- 2015 GlogauAIR artist in residency, Berlin
- 2015 Institut für Alles Mögliche residency program, Berlin

== Collections ==
- Denver Zoo
- Children's Museum of Denver
- Light Art Collection, Amsterdam Light Festival
- Kid's Awesome Museum, Taipei, Taiwan
