= Meyers synthesis =

The Meyers synthesis is an organic synthesis for the preparation of unsymmetrical aldehydes via hydrolysis of an oxazine. The reaction is named after the American chemist Albert Meyers.

The starting compound is a dihydro-1,3-oxazine with an alkyl group in the 2 position. The alpha proton is acidic and can be abstracted by a strong base such as butyl lithium and subsequently alkylated by an alkyl halide (haloalkane). In the next step the nitrogen to carbon double bond (imine) is reduced with sodium borohydride and the resulting oxazine (a hemiaminal) hydrolyzed with water and oxalic acid to the aldehyde.
