= Robin Reid (environmental scientist) =

American environmental scientist

Robin S. Reid
- Education: Colorado State University; University of Washington; Duke University
- Scientific career
- Workplaces: International Livestock Research Institute; Colorado State University
- Thesis: Livestock-mediated tree regeneration : impacts of pastoralists on woodlands in dry, tropical Africa (1992)

Robin S. Reid is an American environmental scientist who is a professor at Colorado State University. She led research activity at the International Livestock Research Institute, Kenya, for almost twenty years. She was elected to the National Academy of Sciences in 2021.

== Early life and education ==
Reid earned a bachelor's degree from Duke University in 1979 and her master's degree in ecology from the University of Washington in 1983. Her research investigated patterns of juvenile mortality in response to mountain goat disturbance in the Olympic National Park. Reid joined Colorado State University as a doctoral researcher. Her doctorate involved studying livestock-mediated tree regeneration.

== Research and career ==
In 1992, Reid joined the team who established the International Livestock Research Institute. She was originally appointed to study the environmental impact of the Tsetse fly. Trypanosomiasis, a condition caused by the Tsetse fly, causes sleeping sickness in humans.

In 1999, Reid launched Land-Use Change Impacts and Dynamics (LUCID), a network of researchers who look to understand land use change in East Africa. LUCID involved policy makers, biodiversity researchers and farmers in Kenya, Tanzania and Uganda. Reid worked to strengthen the relationship between people, their lands and their livestock. She was responsible for the People, Livestock and Environment Program. In this capacity she sought to protect the semi-migratory pastoral lives of the Maasai people whilst also conserving the local big mammals. Between 1976 and 1996 over 70% of the wildlife in the Maasai Mara was lost, and around half of the people were living on less than $1 per day. In 2002, Reid established "The Mara Count", a large-scale survey to count people, wildlife and livestock in the Maasai Mara. The total count involved scientists, tourist operators, land managers and community members, who acquired over three million data points.

Inspired by the Maa language expression "Reto-o-Reto", which means 'I help you; you help me,’, Reid built partnerships between human, wildlife and livestock populations. She coordinated hundreds of meetings with scientists, local communities and policy makers. Reto-o-Reto and the Kitengela Ilparakuo Landowners Association were awarded a Consultative group on international agricultural research award.

Reid left the International Livestock Research Institute in 2008, and joined Colorado State University, where she was appointed Director of the Center for Collaborative Conservation at the Warner College of Natural Resources.

== Awards and honors ==
Reid was elected to the National Academy of Sciences in 2021.

== Selected publications ==
- Herrero, Mario; Thornton, Philip K; Gerber, Pierre; Reid, Robin S (2009-12-01). "Livestock, livelihoods and the environment: understanding the trade-offs". Current Opinion in Environmental Sustainability. 1 (2): 111–120. doi:10.1016/j.cosust.2009.10.003. ISSN 1877-3435.
- Herrero, Mario; Thornton, Philip K; Gerber, Pierre; Reid, Robin S (December 2009). "Livestock, livelihoods and the environment: understanding the trade-offs". Current Opinion in Environmental Sustainability. 1 (2): 111–120. doi:10.1016/j.cosust.2009.10.003. ISSN 1877-3435. Wikidata Q58345333.
- Lamprey, Richard H.; Reid, Robin S. (7 May 2004). "Expansion of human settlement in Kenya's Maasai Mara: what future for pastoralism and wildlife?". Journal of Biogeography. 31 (6): 997–1032. doi:10.1111/j.1365-2699.2004.01062.x. ISSN 0305-0270. S2CID 82633020. Wikidata Q111798374.
- Reid, Robin Spencer (2012). Savannas of Our Birth: People, Wildlife and Change in East Africa. University of California Press. ISBN 978-0-520-27355-9. OCLC 929402749.
