= Children's Museum of Denver =

Museum in Denver, Colorado, US

Children's Museum of Denver at Marsico Campus
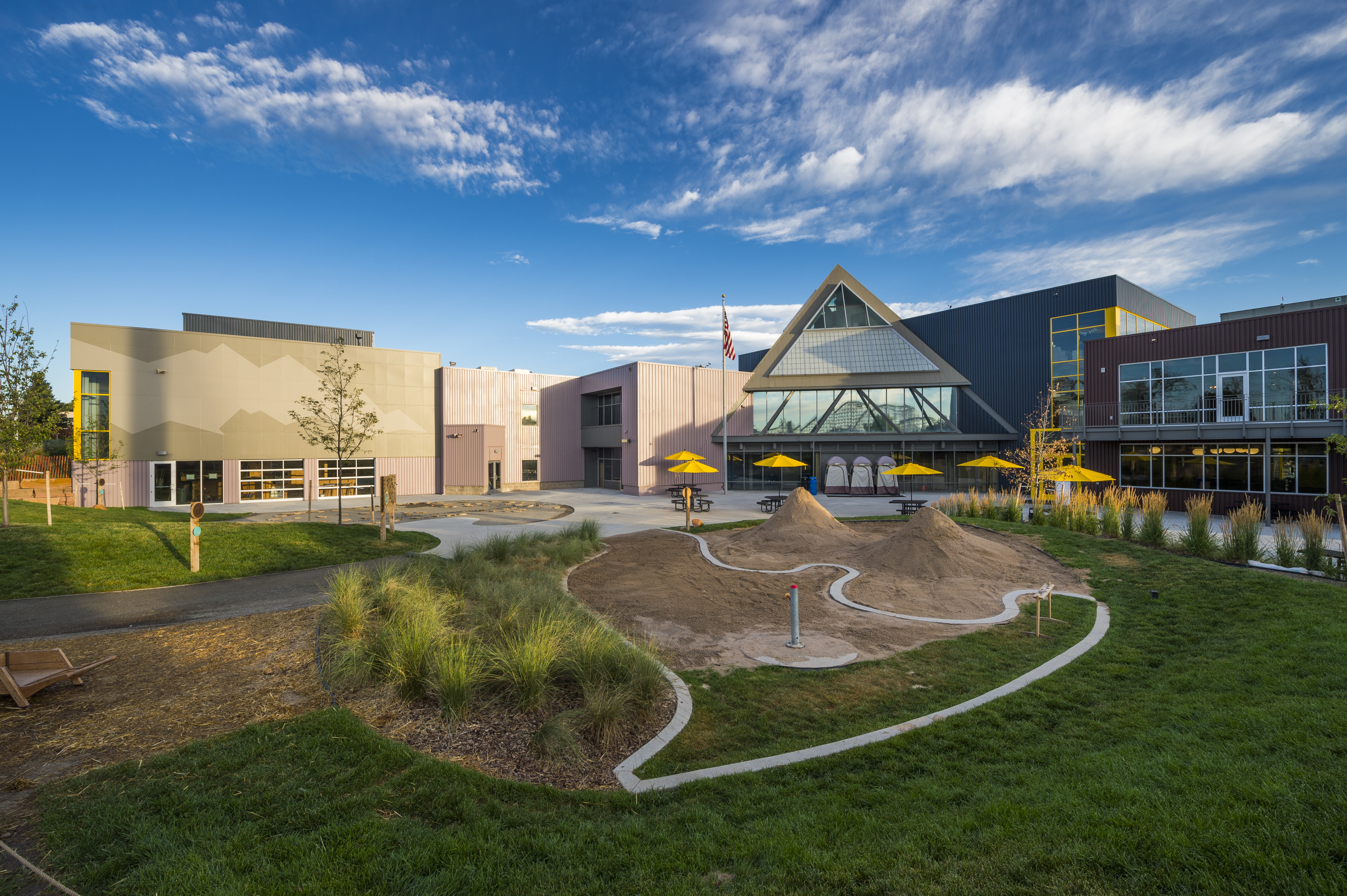
- Established: 1973
- Location: 2121 Children's Museum Drive, Denver, CO 80211
- Type: Children's museum
- Website: www.mychildsmuseum.org

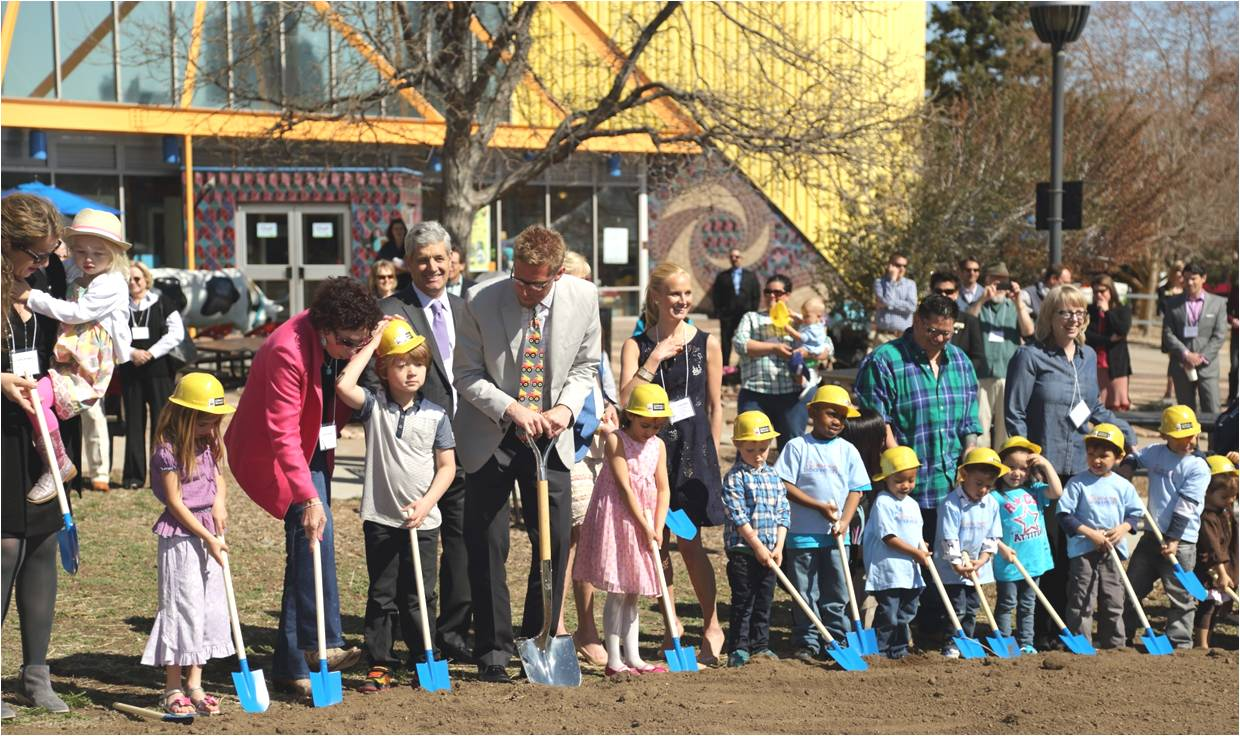
2014 Expansion ground breaking ceremony

The Children's Museum of Denver at Marsico Campus is located in downtown Denver at 2121 Children’s Museum Drive, Denver, Colorado, United States. The 46,902 square foot building is located on a 9-acre campus and has 20 exhibits and approximately 500,000 visitors annually. The museum focuses on early childhood education, serving children newborn through age eight and their caregivers through interactive exhibits and educational programming. Its core early learning focus areas include: Science, Technology, Engineering and Math (STEM), Health and Wellness, 21st Century Skills, Literacy and the Arts. The museum is a member of the Association of Children’s Museums.

The Children’s Museum is a 501(c)(3) private non-profit and a SCFD Tier II organization.

The Museum offers a variety of accommodations for individuals with disabilities, including Low-sensory Evenings. Reservations can be made on the Museum's website.

== History ==
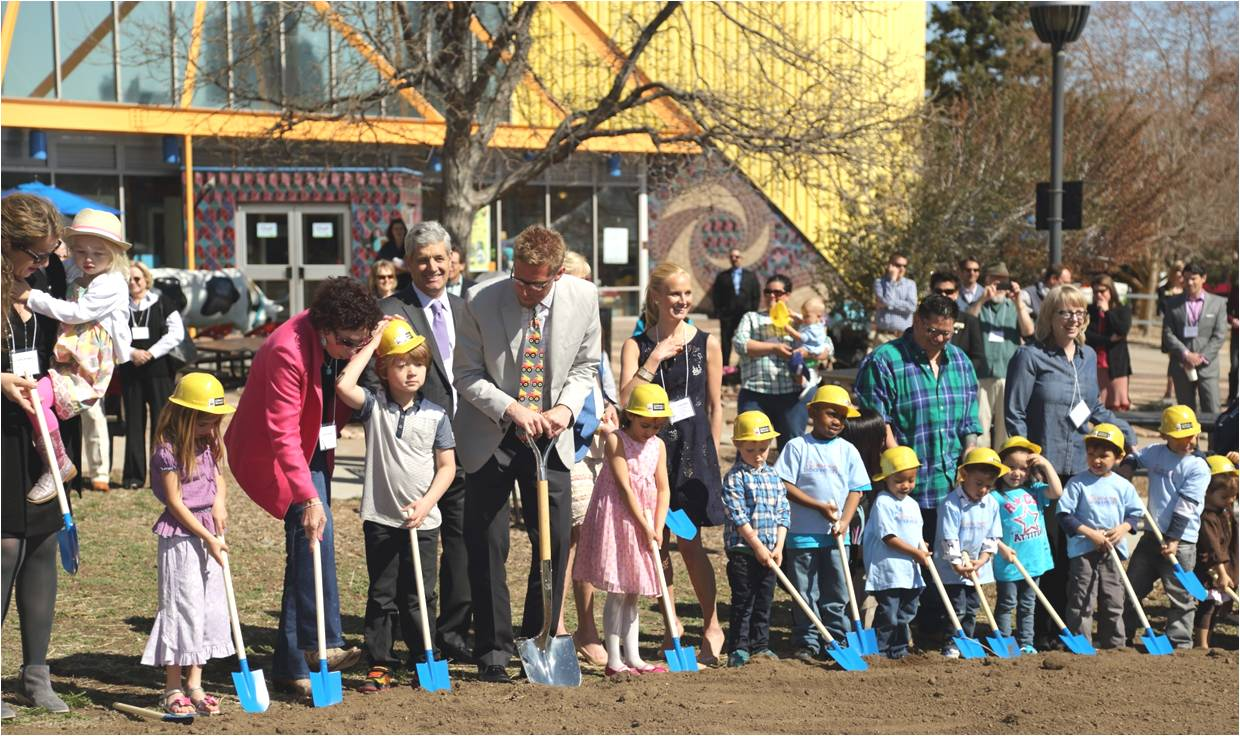
2014 Expansion Ground Breaking Ceremony

The museum was founded in June 1973 in a traveling bus. In 1975 the museum moved into a renovated building on Bannock Street and then moved to its current location along the South Platte River in 1984. In 2015, the museum was made Early Childhood Education Zone’s list of top 25 children’s museums in the United States, coming in at number 11.

In the spring of 2014, the Children’s Museum of Denver broke ground on a $16.1 million expansion. Following several years of planning and two years of construction, the expansion doubled the size of the museum and included 8 additional exhibits, 1 outdoor and 7 indoor. The expanded Museum stayed open during the expansion with its grand reopening on November 20, 2015, as the Children’s Museum of Denver at Marsico Campus.

== Exhibits and Events ==
The Children’s Museum of Denver at Marsico Campus is home to a variety of exhibits that are designed for children newborn – 8 years old and their caregivers. Bubbles, Water and Kinetics introduce children to STEM learning concepts, kids can express their creativity in The Art Studio and Assembly Plant, engage in dramatic play in Ready Vet Go, My Market and Fire Station No. 1, and practice their chef skills in The Teaching Kitchen. Exhibit highlights include Adventure Forest, a 500ft long outdoor adventure course and immersive art installation and Bloom, whimsical indoor forest designed just for children newborn – 36 months and their caregivers.

The Museum also offers family-friendly events throughout the year including their annual Noon Year’s Eve celebration, Party for Our Planet event for Earth Day and Harvest Hoot fall festival.

== Pedagogy ==
Constructivism as a theory of learning was established by developmental psychologist Jean Piaget, whose research demonstrated that children construct and reconstruct knowledge through firsthand interactions with materials and phenomena. According to Piaget, learning and conceptual knowledge cannot be imparted through the passive receipt of information. For a child to make sense of the world, they need to explore and experiment for themselves. Like Jean Piaget, Russian psychologist Lev Vygotsky believe that children learn through active experiences in their environment and that during play, children are able to think in more complex and abstract ways.

Based on this understanding of play and child development, the museum includes educational programming and exhibits to allow for open-ended play. Additionally, the museum recognizes the importance of the roles of parents and caregivers in a child’s development and designs exhibit spaces to include adult engagement.
