= Holly Stein =

American geologist

Holly J. Stein
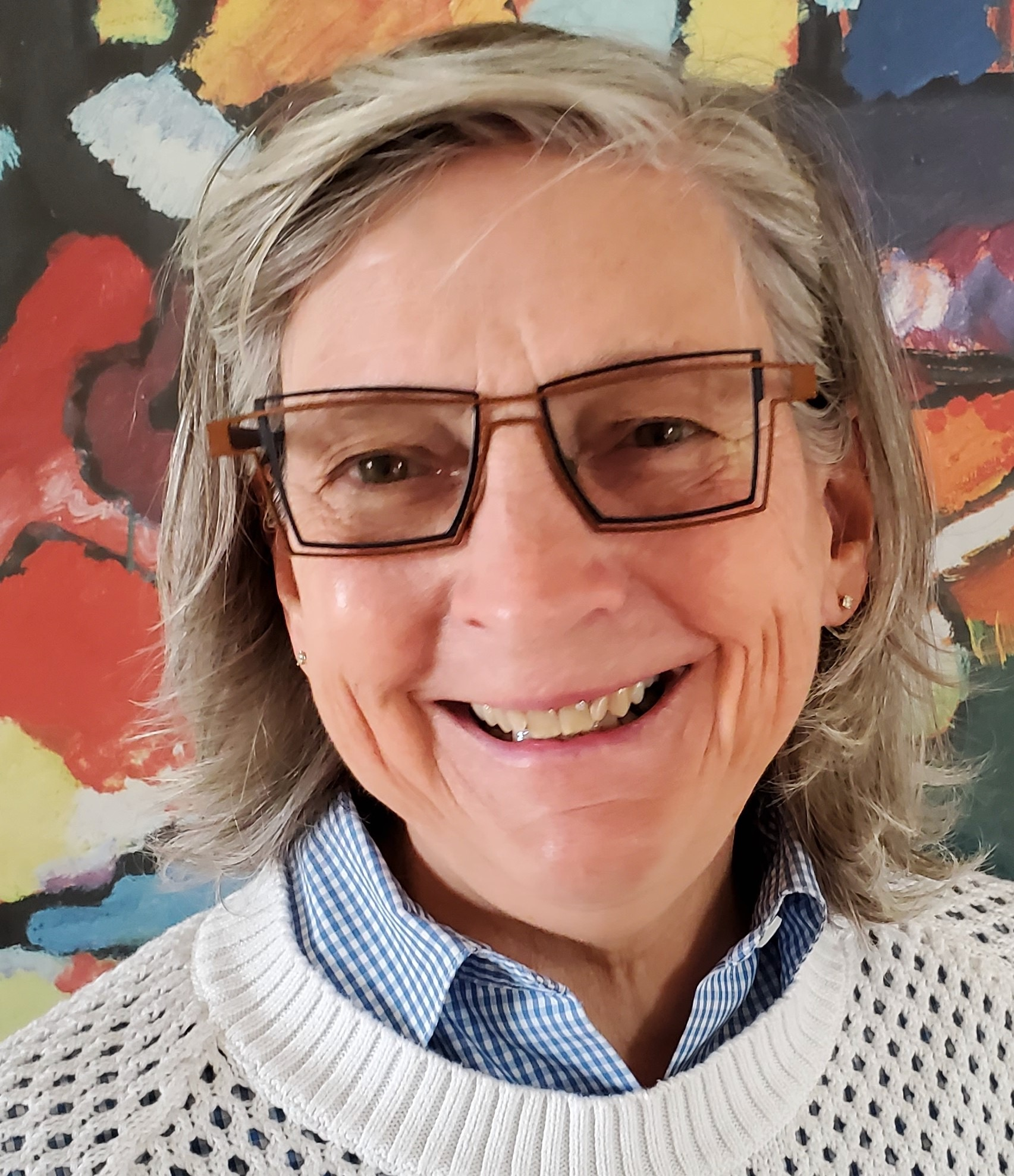
- Stein in 2020
- Education: Western Illinois University; University of North Carolina at Chapel Hill
- Scientific career
- Fields: Geochemistry; Mineral Deposits; Geology
- Workplaces: founder of AIRIE Program, Fort Collins, Colorado, USA; NHM, University of Oslo, emerita

Holly Jayne Stein is an American geologist who is a senior research scientist and a professor emerita, NHM, University of Oslo, Norway. She established the AIRIE (Applied Isotope Research for Industry and the Environment) Program and has led the center since 1995. Her research focuses on the development of the rhenium-osmium (Re-Os) geochronometers. In 2015, she was elected Geochemistry Fellow of the European Association of Geochemistry.

== Education ==
Stein attended Western Illinois University and completed her bachelor’s degree there. She received her master’s and doctorate degrees from the University of North Carolina at Chapel Hill.

== Research and career ==
Stein joined the Department of Geosciences at Colorado State University (CSU) as a senior research scientist in March 1998. She is a professor at CSU and Center for Earth Evolution and Dynamics at the University of Oslo, Norway.

Stein established AIRIE Program in 1995, which is located in CSU. She has been leading the team as a director to date. AIRIE develops Re-Os geochronology and applies the dating techniques to explore various fields ranging from mass extinction to energy resources. The team investigates metallogenesis on ore and petroleum deposits to understand their relationships to geologic processes. AIRIE is also known for its technology of dating molybdenite.

In 2004, Stein developed innovative pyrite Re-Os geochronology and contributed to revealing the presence of a significant amount of atmospheric oxygen in 2.32 billion years ago. Her geochronological analysis provided a better understanding of diverse sedimentary and paleoclimatology mechanisms.

Stein is actively involved in several geological societies and editorial boards, including the Society of Economic Geologists, where she served as vice-president between 1999-2000.

== Awards and honors ==
- 1992 Gilbert Fellowship from the United States Geological Survey
- 1992 Outstanding Woman Alumna Award of Western Illinois University
- 2000 Fulbright Research Fellowship
- 2005 Silver Medal of the Society of Economic Geologists
- 2008 Helmholtz-Humboldt Research Award
- 2015 Geochemistry Fellow of the European Association of Geochemistry
- 2016 Jules Braunstein Memorial Award of the American Association of Petroleum Geologists
- 2020 Bunsen Medal in Geochemistry of the European Geosciences Union
- 2023 Fellow of the American Association for the Advancement of Science
- 2024 Penrose Gold Medal from The Society of Economic Geologists

== Selected publications ==
- Bekker, A., Holland, H., Wang, PL., Rumble III, D., Stein, H. J., Hannah, J. L., Coetzee, L. L., and Beukes, N. J., (2004), Dating the rise of atmospheric oxygen, Nature 427, 117–120.
- Stein, H. J., Markey, R. J., Morgan, J. W., Hannah, J. L., and Scherstén, A., (2001), The remarkable Re–Os chronometer in molybdenite: how and why it works, Terra Nova 13, 479-486.
