= Albert Meyers =

American organic chemist

Albert I. Meyers (November 22, 1932 – October 23, 2007) was an American organic chemist, University Distinguished Professor Emeritus at Colorado State University, and member of the U.S. National Academy of Sciences.

Born in New York City, Meyers earned undergraduate and doctoral degrees from New York University in 1954 and 1957, respectively. After finishing his graduate degree, Meyers worked as a research chemist for a year before joining the faculty of Louisiana State University as an associate professor. He rose to the rank of full professor in 1964, and was a special NIH fellow at Harvard University in 1965–1966. Meyers later moved to Wayne State University in 1970 and finally to Colorado State University in 1972.

Meyers has served on the editorial boards and staff of several major chemical journals, including the Journal of the American Chemical Society. For his work in the area of synthetic organic chemistry, particularly in synthesis of heterocyclic compounds, Meyers was elected to the U.S. National Academy of Sciences in 1994. An endowed faculty chair at Colorado State in synthetic organic chemistry and Meyers synthesis is named in honor of Meyers.
