= Sean Colgan =

Researcher

Sean Patrick Colgan
- Born: Denver, Colorado, U.S.
- Education: Colorado State University
- Known for: Research in immunology and gastroenterology
- Scientific career
- Fields: Gastroenterology, Immunology. Microbiology

Sean Patrick Colgan (born in Denver, Colorado) is an American medical researcher and professor of medicine. He is a Distinguished Professor and the Levine-Kern Professor of Medicine and Immunology at the University of Colorado School of Medicine.

== Education ==
Colgan studied at Colorado State University, earning a B.S. in microbiology in 1985, an M.S. in experimental pathology in 1988. He completed his Ph.D. in experimental pathology in 1991.

== Career ==
From 1991 to 1994 he completed postdoctoral training as a research fellow in pathology at Brigham and Women’s Hospital and Harvard Medical School. In 1994, he co-founded the Center for Experimental Therapeutics at Brigham and Women’s Hospital and served as its associate director until 2006. He was on the Harvard Medical School faculty from 1994 to 2006, where in 2005 he was promoted to professor.

In 2006, he joined the University of Colorado School of Medicine as professor of medicine and founded the Mucosal Inflammation Program. In 2010 he also became professor of immunology, microbiology and molecular biology He is the Levine-Kern Professor of Medicine and Immunology and was named a University of Colorado Distinguished Professor in 2023.

Colgan’s research has mainly focused on mucosal inflammation and epithelial barrier regulation in the gastrointestinal tract. He has authored over 275 peer-reviewed articles in academic journals. In 2012, he co-authored an Annual Review of Physiology article on adenosine and hypoxia-inducible factor (HIF) signaling in intestinal injury and recovery. Studies conducted at his laboratory examined how tissue hypoxia and hypoxia-inducible factor (HIF) signaling, together with purinergic pathways that generate extracellular adenosine (CD39/CD73 and A2B receptor), shape inflammatory responses and promote barrier protection and resolution in experimental models of inflammatory bowel disease (IBD). In 2021, his research group collaborated with Rice University bioengineers to apply a pH-sensing Escherichia coli (E. coli) strain as a noninvasive reporter of gastrointestinal acidosis in a mouse model of Crohn’s disease. Colgan and his group have also investigated metabolic reprogramming in inflamed mucosa to identify endogenous pro-resolution pathways and therapeutic targets. His group has investigated creatine and purine metabolism, autophagy, microbiota-derived metabolites, and targeted chemical probes relevant to mucosal repair.

Colgan serves on the editorial boards of the American Journal of Physiology, Hypoxia, Journal of Molecular Medicine, and American Journal of Pathology. He was formerly section editor of the Journal of Immunology and Inflammatory Bowel Diseases.

Colgan won the 2019 University of Colorado Dean’s PhD Student Mentor of the Year Award and the 2024 University of Colorado Anschutz Medical Campus Mentor of the Year Award.
