= Nutrient film technique =

Hydroponic technique

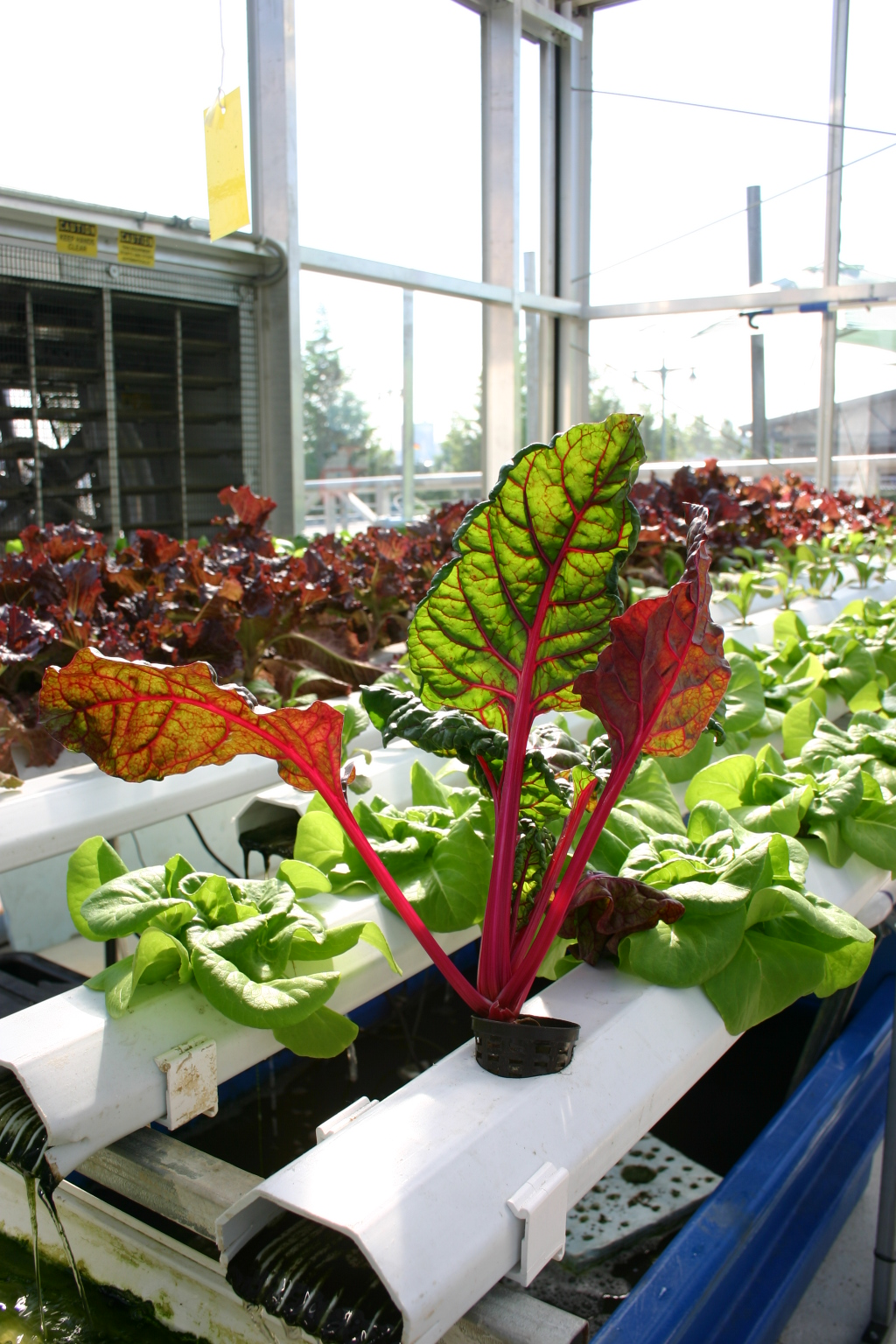
Plants placed into nutrient-rich water channels in an NFT system

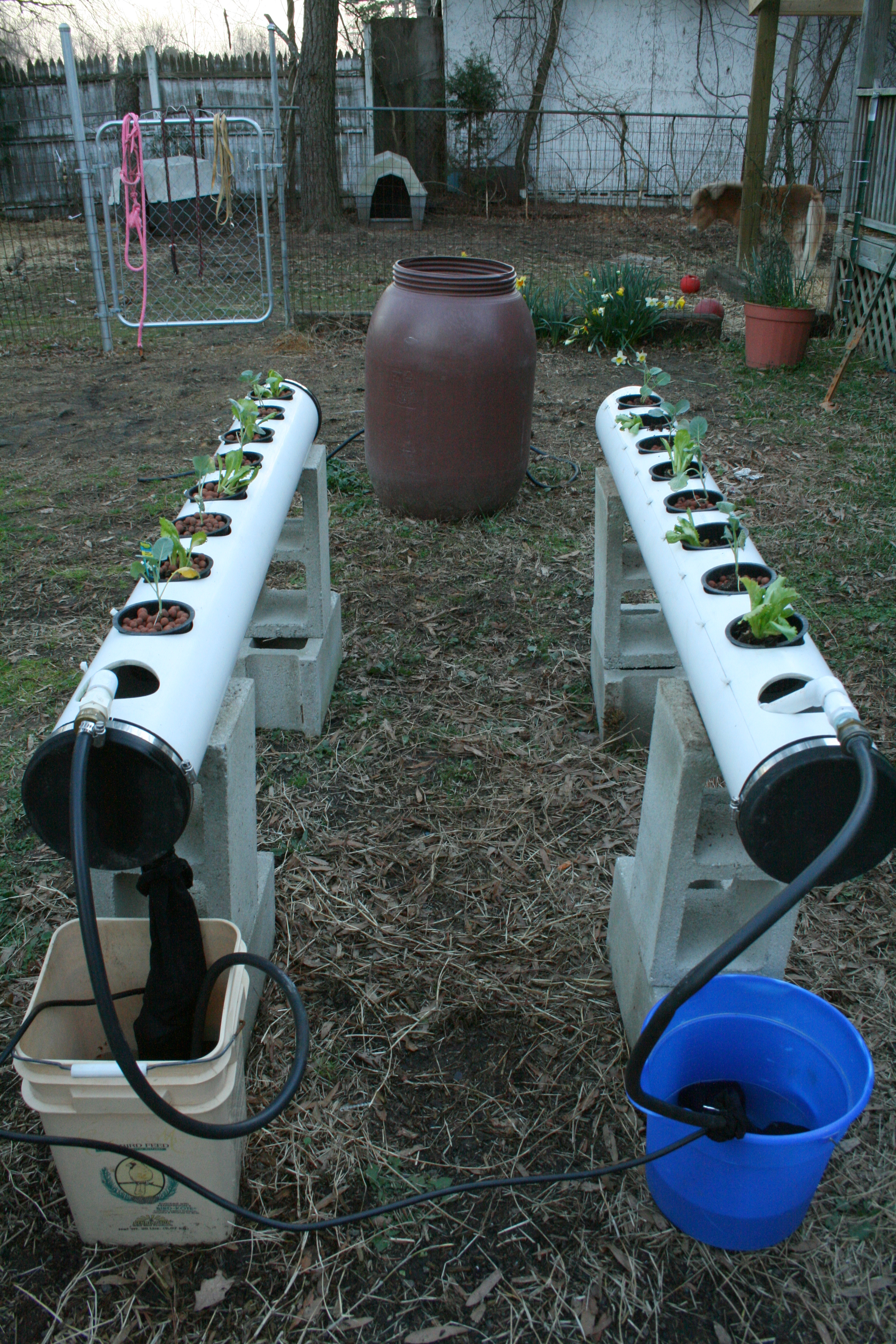
A home-built NFT hydroponic system

Nutrient film technique (NFT) is a hydroponic technique where in a very shallow stream of water containing all the dissolved nutrients required for plant growth is re-circulated past the bare roots of plants in a watertight gully, also known as channels.

== History ==
NFT was pioneered in 1965 by Allen Cooper at the Glasshouse Crops Research institute in Littlehampton, England. In an ideal system, the depth of the recirculating stream is very shallow, little more than a film of water, hence the name 'nutrient film'. This ensures that the thick root mat which develops in the bottom of the channel receives adequate air exposure.

== Description ==
A properly designed NFT system is based on using the right channel slope, the right flow rate, and the right channel length. The plant roots are exposed to adequate supplies of water, oxygen and nutrients. In earlier production systems, there was a conflict between the supply of these requirements, since excessive or deficient amounts of one results in an imbalance of one or both of the others.

NFT, because of its design, provides a system wherein all three requirements for healthy plant growth can be met at the same time, provided that the simple concept of NFT is always remembered and practiced. The result of these advantages is that higher yields of high-quality produce are obtained over an extended period of cropping. A downside of NFT is that it has very little buffering against interruptions in the flow, such as a result of a power outage. But, overall, it is one of the more productive techniques.

The same design characteristics apply to all conventional NFT systems. While slopes along channels of 1:100 have been recommended, in practice it can be difficult to build a base for channels that is sufficiently true to enable nutrient films to flow without the occurrence of waterlogging and ponding in locally depressed areas. As a consequence, slopes of 1:30 to 1:40 are sometimes used. This allows for minor irregularities in the surface. The slope may be provided by the floor, or benches or racks that hold the channels.

== Flow rates ==
As a general guide, flow rates for each gully should be 1 litre per minute. At planting, rates may be half this, and the upper limit of 2L/min appears about the maximum. Flow rates beyond these extremes are often associated with nutritional problems. Depressed growth rates of many crops have been observed when channels exceed 12 metres in length. On rapidly growing crops, tests have indicated that, while oxygen levels remain adequate, nitrogen may be depleted over the length of the gully. As a consequence, channel length should not exceed 10–15 metres. In situations where this is not possible, the reductions in growth can be eliminated by placing another nutrient feed halfway along the gully and reducing flow rates to 1L/min through each outlet. Care needs to be taken to maintain hygienic conditions and to avoid heavy metal contamination of NFT systems by using mainly plastic or stainless steel pumps and components.

== Lettuce ==
The most commonly grown crop in NFT systems is lettuce. Popular varieties include ‘Ostinata’, ‘Flandria’, ‘Cherokee’, ‘Ruby Sky’, ‘Vulcan’, and ‘Rex’. According to Cornell University’s Controlled Environment Agriculture group, a 5-to-6-ounce head of lettuce can be produced in 35 days (from seed to harvest) with proper inputs and conditions (Mattson). These inputs and conditions include adequate light intensity, temperature, relative humidity, spacing, uniform water delivery, nutrient concentrations, oxygen delivery to root systems, pH, electrical conductivity, air circulation, among other factors. Seedlings, usually sown in rockwool cubes, are transplanted into NFT channels after the emergence of 3 to 4 true leaves. Categorized as a fast-growing crop, approximately 60% of the total leaf area and 70% of the dry biomass are generated in the last 20 days of production. Lettuce seedlings are placed in NFT channels 6 to 8 inches apart to provide enough room between crops for proper leaf development. Research has recommended to use channels for lettuce production no longer than 9 feet to minimize the difference in nutrient concentrations at the entrance and exit points of each channel (Al-Tawaha et al). Lettuce yield and productivity is heavily dependent on light intensity. Higher light intensities lead to quicker biomass gain however; the maximum recommended Daily Light Integral (DLI) for head lettuce is 17 mol·m-2·d-1. Higher intensities can lead to the physiological disorder of leaf tipburn and render crops unmarketable. Some lettuce cultivars are more sensitive tipburn and lower DLIs should be used. To prevent tipburn from taking place, provide crops with adequate air flow and circulation, decrease relative humidity, and decrease the temperature in your growing environment, and you may need to lower your DLI. For proper nutrient uptake, maintain a fertigation pH level of 5.4.-5.8 and an electrical conductivity level between 1.7 and 2.5. A systematic advantage of using the NFT system to grow crops is not needing to add dissolved oxygen to your water reservoir because the recirculating water becomes oxygenated Equally as critical as the delivery of oxygen to root systems is the introduction of carbon dioxide to the growing environment to promote photosynthesis. The largest jumps in yield figures are seen when carbon dioxide levels increase from 500 to 1,000 parts per million. Researchers recommend carbon dioxide enrichment of 1,000 to 1,200 parts per million. Harvested lettuce can be packaged in plastic clamshells at 40 degrees Fahrenheit with or without roots (Brechner). After harvest, all NFT channels should be properly sanitized and scrubbed to prevent the possibility of pathogen build up (Kaiser).

A hypothetical study estimated that in Arizona the yield per area and year in a controlled greenhouse environment using NFT could be 10 times higher compared to traditional farming with one crop per year. Water usage could be 13 times lower in one crop cycle than traditional farming. But up to 100 times more energy would be necessary as a greenhouse in the desert climate would need to be heated in winter as well as cooled in the summer.

== Potato minitubers ==
Most potato varieties are maintained in plant tissue culture and micropropagation methods are used to increase the amount of planting material. Since tissue culture plants perform poorly when planted into field soil, they are instead planted into greenhouses or screenhouses to generate tubers, which are referred to as minitubers. In many countries, it is common for NFT or aeroponic systems to be used for production of minitubers from tissue culture plantlets. The minitubers are planted into the field 6 to 14 months after harvest to grow a crop of potatoes. This first crop of field-grown potatoes is typically replanted to generate more potatoes rather than consumed.

== Controversy ==
A leading proponent of NFT was Dr. Allen Cooper, a scientist at the Glasshouse Crops Research Station in England who published the book The ABC of NFT. NFT systems were used by a significant proportion of commercial growers in the UK through the 1980-1990 period but were only used for lettuce in Europe. Dutch growers particularly rejected NFT because of the perceived high risk of disease spread by the recirculating solution. NFT ensures that plants have unlimited access to water at all times, but it is now recognized that fruiting crops can benefit from carefully limited water supplies. Leafy crops like lettuce benefit from unlimited water supplies and are still widely grown using NFT, but now most commercial greenhouse crops of tomatoes, capsicums and cucumbers are grown hydroponically using some kind of inert media, with rockwool being the most important medium worldwide. NFT systems remain in widespread commercial use for leafy greens, particularly lettuce, herbs, and strawberries.

== See also ==
- Aquaponics
