= George E. Staples =

Veterinary researcher

- Born: November 2, 1918; Kanosh, Utah, U.S.
- Died: February 2, 1993 (aged 74); Provo, Utah, U.S.
- Occupations: Veterinarian, college professor

George Emmett Staples (November 2, 1918 – February 2, 1993) was an American veterinary researcher in animal nutrition and diarrheal treatment, and the author of three publications of the Cooperative Extension Service, North Dakota State University. His research contributed to the improvement of the livestock industry in the area from the early 1970s to mid-1980s.

== Early life and education ==
Staples was born in Kanosh, Utah, the son of Grant deVere Staples and Grace Evelyn Whitaker Staples. He attended Millard High School in the county seat of Fillmore, Utah, and Utah State Agricultural College. He left college early to serve as a missionary of the Church of Jesus Christ of Latter-day Saints (LDS Church) in Florida and Georgia from 1939 to 1941. Staples joined the United States Navy shortly after the attack on Pearl Harbor in December 1941 and was assigned to the USS Muliphen as communications officer until the end of the Pacific War.

After World War II, he graduated from Utah State Agricultural College with a B.S. in animal science, earned a master's degree from South Dakota State College of Agricultural & Mechanical Arts at Brookings, South Dakota, and completed doctoral studies in veterinary medicine at Colorado A&M at Ft. Collins, Colorado in 1954.

== Career ==
Staples had a private veterinary practice at Afton, Wyoming, for a few years before landing a field position with the U.S. Department of Agriculture where he was able to work out of his hometown of Kanosh. Concerned with the possibility of radiation poisoning, Staples felt it prudent to move his family to Topeka in the summer of 1960.

In Kansas he worked for Morris Research Laboratories, now part of the Hill's Pet Nutrition Group. Staples' work in the relatively new field attracted the attention of North Dakota State University. He moved to North Dakota in 1964.

Staples' experience in private practice, USDA field work with livestock diseases and pioneering research in pet nutrition was used to improve the livestock industry in North Dakota. At least one notorious trafficker in diseased cattle was put out of business by the techniques Staples shared in early disease detection and treatment of livestock diseases, particularly calf scours. A major breakthrough to treatment of the disease was put on the market through Staples research shortly after publication of his 1982 publication Calf scours: Causes, prevention, treatment. However, the ingredients were so simple and inexpensive that none of the major pharmaceutical companies felt it profitable to market commercially.

== Personal life ==
Staples married Katherine Stanford in 1948; they had six children. Shortly before his retirement from the university, Staples was diagnosed with myelofibrosis from radiation exposure during his USDA field work more than a quarter century earlier. One son died in infancy, and his eldest son died at age 32 in 1983; Staples died in 1993, in Provo.

== Selected publications ==
- "A Comparison of the Relative Accuracy between Seven-Day and Ten-Day Collection Periods in Digestion Trials" (1951, with W. E. Dinusson)
- Selecting healthy baby calves (Circular A-566) (1971)
- The calf scour problem (Circular A-527 Rev) (1973)
- Calf scours: Causes, prevention, treatment (AS-776) (1982)
