= Susan Lowdermilk =

American book artist and printmaker (born 1963)

- Born: 1963 (age 62–63)
- Education: BFA, Printmaking and Graphic Design, 1986, Colorado State University
- Alma mater: MFA, Printmaking, 1991, University of Oregon; Advisor: Peggy Prentice
- Known for: Woodcuts; engraving; etching; artists' books
- Style: Contemporary
- Website: http://susanlowdermilk.com/about

Susan Lowdermilk (born 1963) is a contemporary book artist and printmaker who works "primarily in woodcut, wood engraving and etching". She also teaches graphic design and studio art classes at Lane Community College.

== Education ==
In 1986 Lowdermilk earned a Bachelor of Fine Arts in Printmaking and Graphic Arts at Colorado State University, and in 1991, a Master of Fine Arts in Printmaking at the University of Oregon.

== Critical reception ==
Denis Keogh wrote that Lowdermilk "continues to challenge the notion of what an artist's book can be through her own practice as a printmaker and book artist."

The Seattle Times noted that in the Tacoma Art Museum "Ink This!" exhibit, "There's even a zoetrope by Susan Lowdermilk that you can spin, sending her prints of rocking horses into motion."

Eadem Mutata Resurgo ('I rise the same but changed'), one of Lowdermilk's art books based on Jacob Bernoulli's miraculous spiral, was called the "star of the show" by Art Voice of Eugene. It was also the subject of Richard Taylor's analysis of virtual fractals and "persistence of human vision to bring virtual fractals to life... incorporating her prints of fractal patterns into zoetropes and phenakistoscopes."

She serves as a juror for exhibitions of artist's books.

She has said of her work, "We often take for granted what we experience in our daily lives. Through my artwork, I attempt to show the ordinary as extraordinary. I focus on personal subjects, namely my family and my surrounding environment."

== Selected exhibitions ==
- Getty Museum
- Library of Congress
- New York Public Library
- Portland Art Museum
- 2014 "Ink This!", Tacoma Art Museum
- White Lotus Gallery, Eugene
