= David Asay =

American politician (born 1925)

Member of the Wyoming House of Representatives from the Washakie County district
- In office January 9, 1979 – January 11, 1983

Personal details
- Born: David Harris Asay; August 15, 1925 (age 101) Lovell, Wyoming, U.S.
- Party: Republican
- Spouse: Charlotte (died 2013)
- Children: 5
- Education: Meeteetse High School; Colorado State University
- Profession: Politician, veterinarian

David Harris Asay (born August 15, 1925) is an American politician and veterinarian from Worland, Wyoming, who served in the Wyoming House of Representatives, representing Washakie County from 1979 to 1983 (Note: According to the Wyoming Legislature, Asay served from 1979 to 1982.) as a Republican in the 45th and 46th Wyoming Legislatures.

== Early life and education ==
Asay was born in Lovell, Wyoming, on August 15, 1925. He attended Meeteetse High School. Asay subsequently attended Colorado State University, graduating in 1955 with a degree.

== Career ==
Asay served in the Wyoming House of Representatives from 1979 to 1983, representing Washakie County as a Republican in the 45th and 46th Wyoming Legislatures.

During his time in office, Asay served on the Livestock Board, in addition to the following standing committees.

- Agriculture, Public Lands and Water Resources (1979–1980)
- Education (1981–1982)
- Labor, Health and Social Services (1981–1982)

Outside of politics, Asay was also a veterinarian.

== Personal life ==
Asay was married and had five children.

== Notes ==
Wyoming House of Representatives
Preceded by —	Member of the Wyoming House of Representatives from the Washakie County district 1979–1983	Succeeded by —
