= Edward Harwood (American inventor) =

Edward "Ed" Harwood (February 4, 1950 - July 22, 2021) was an American inventor, entrepreneur, and one of the pioneers of aeroponics. He was the founder of Aero Farm Systems, L.L.C. (AeroFarms), as well as the chief inventor of “Method and apparatus for aeroponic farming" (United States Patent No. 8,782,948).

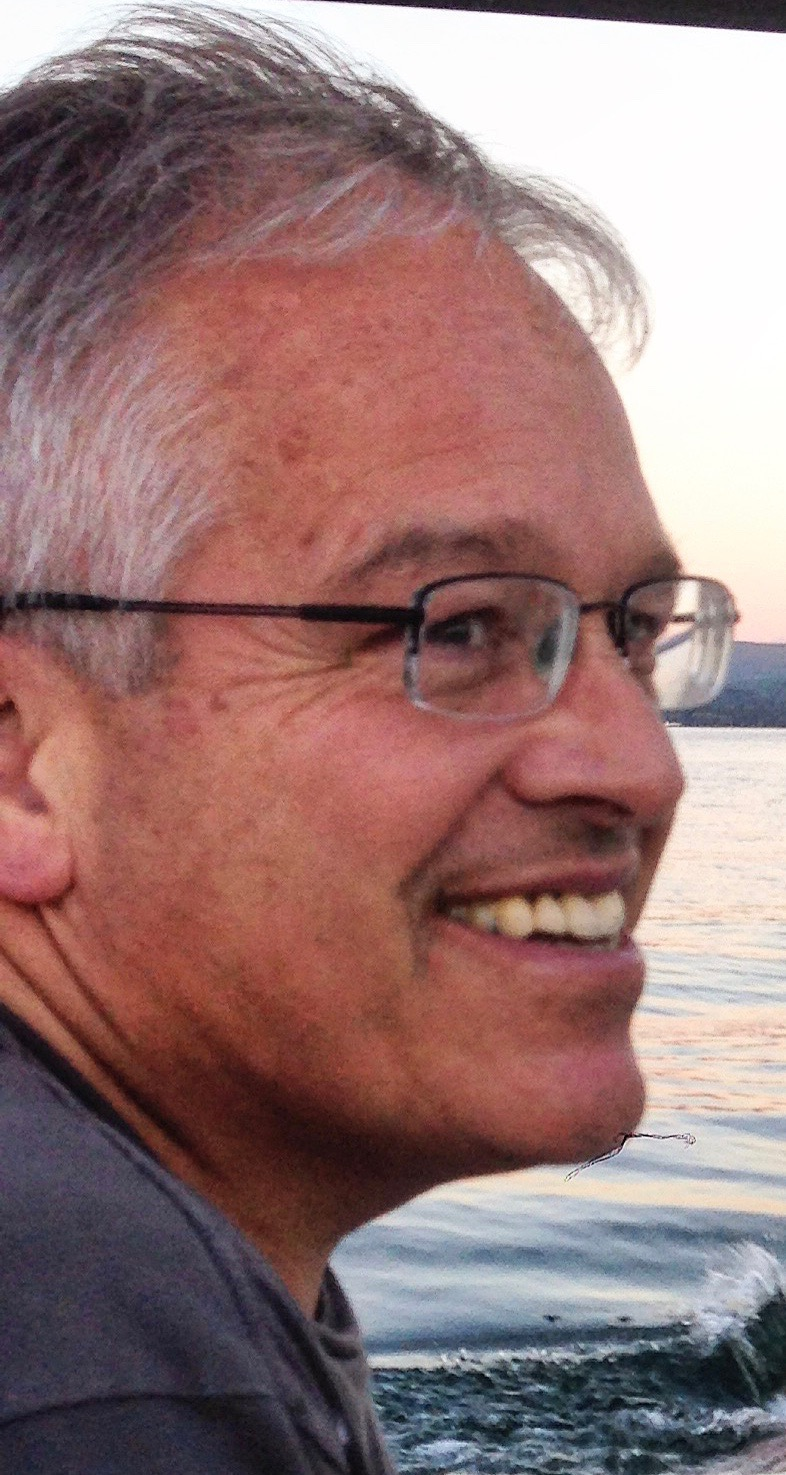
Ed Harwood

== Early life and education ==
Ed Harwood was born in Stoughton, Massachusetts. He attended Colorado State University, where he received three separate degrees: a BS in microbiology, a BS in animal science, and an MS in animal science. Harwood then went on to receive his PhD in dairy science and artificial intelligence from the University of Wisconsin-Madison.

== Career ==
In 2003, after serving as the Associate Director of Cornell Cooperative Extension, he built a prototype aeroponic system designed to grow vegetables indoors in a sustainable way, without pesticides. The advantages of the system, in comparison to traditional agriculture, include: less water usage, better air flow, and the ability to grow vegetables year round. After experimenting to find the most suitable textiles for the system, a critical piece of the technology’s success, he settled on a durable microfleece cloth that could be reused.

In 2004, Harwood took his technology and launched the Ithaca, NY based farming venture GreatVeggies. He began selling lettuce to local grocers and restaurants. After significant struggle finding investors interested in aeroponics, he received funding from the Quercus Trust and 21Ventures in 2009. He renamed the company AeroFarms and transitioned his focus from selling lettuce to selling the patented systems to farmers and entrepreneurs.

Harwood's first notable success as CEO of AeroFarms came in 2010 when he and EcoVeggies partnered with Phillip's Academy Charter School in Newark, NJ. One of Harwood’s patented aeroponic systems was placed in a science classroom as part of the school's EcoSPACES program, with the goal of helping students learn about sustainable growing techniques. The aeroponic system is currently located in the cafeteria, steps from the salad bar. The leafy-green vegetables grown by the students are used in the school kitchen to prepare nutritious and healthy meals for the kids. In April 2016, as part of her Let's Move initiative, Michelle Obama visited Phillip's Academy and was shown the aeroponic system by the students before eating a meal next to it in the cafeteria.

After receiving awards in 2010 and 2011, including the Red Herring Global Top 100 North America award and World Technology Award for the Environment, Harwood and AeroFarms accepted investment from other partners, including Goldman Sachs, Prudential and the city of Newark. Late in 2011, David Rosenberg and Marc Oshima of Just Greens, LLC merged with Aero Farm Systems, LLC and began doing business under the name of AeroFarms. Rosenberg and Oshima were the catalyst to today’s AeroFarms, raising funds and promoting the company. In early 2014, AeroFarms broke ground on the world's largest indoor vertical farm, a 70,000-square-foot, $39 million facility located in a former steel mill in Newark. The record breaking farm will grow vegetables using the aeroponic system patented by Harwood, who died on July 22, 2021, as chief science officer of AeroFarms.

Ian Frazier, in The New Yorker, likened Harwood's invention to the Wright brothers' first bi-plane, stating: "For concentrated ingenuity and handcrafted uniqueness, its closest simile, I think, is the Wright brothers’ first biplane, the Flyer, now on display in the National Air and Space Museum, in Washington. Like the Flyer, and like many other great inventions, Harwood’s prototype is also an objet d’art." On June 25, 2018, Harwood was awarded the United FreshTEC Achievement Award for outstanding technical achievements by the United Fresh Produce Association for advancing “the fresh produce industry through innovation in indoor growing technologies.”
