= Aeroponics =

Mist-based plant growing process

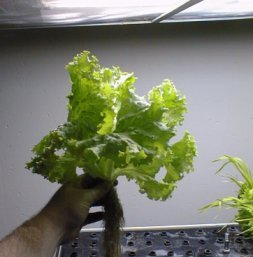
Lettuce and wheat grown in an aeroponic apparatus, NASA, 1998

Aeroponics is the process of cultivating plants in an air or mist environment, eliminating the need for soil or an aggregate medium. The term "aeroponic" originates from the ancient Greek: aer (air) and ponos (labor, hardship, or toil). It falls under the category of hydroponics, as water is employed in aeroponics to deliver nutrients to the plants.

== Methods ==
The fundamental principle of aeroponic growing entails suspending plants in a closed or semi-closed environment whilst spraying their dangling roots and lower stems with a nutrient-rich water solution in an atomized or sprayed form. The upper portion of the plant, including the leaves and crown, referred to as the canopy, extends above. The plant support structure keeps the roots separated. To minimize labor and expenses, closed-cell foam is often compressed around the lower stem and inserted into an opening in the aeroponic chamber. In the case of larger plants, trellising is employed to support the weight of the vegetation and fruits.

The goal is to maintain an environment free from pests and diseases, allowing the plants to thrive and grow faster than those cultivated in a growing medium. However, since most aeroponic environments are not completely sealed off from the outside, pests and diseases can still pose a threat. Controlled environments facilitate the advancement of plant development, health, growth, flowering, and fruiting for various plant species and cultivars.

Due to the sensitivity of root systems, aeroponics is often combined with conventional hydroponics. This serves as a backup nutrition and water supply in case of any failure in the aeroponic system, acting as an emergency "crop saver."

High-pressure aeroponics refers to the method of delivering nutrients to the roots using mist heads with a size range of 20-50 micrometers. This is achieved using a high-pressure diaphragm pump operating at around 80 pounds per square inch (550 kPa).

== Benefits and drawbacks ==
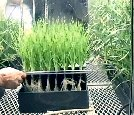
Many types of plants can be grown aeroponically.

=== Increased air exposure ===
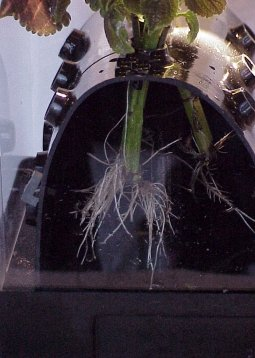
Close-up of the first patented aeroponic plant support structure (1983). Its unrestricted support of the plant allows for normal growth in the air/moisture environment, and is still in use today.

Air cultures maximize air exposure to facilitate optimal plant growth. The materials and devices that hold and support aeroponically grown plants must be completely free from disease or pathogens. A vital characteristic of a genuine aeroponic culture and apparatus is minimal plant support features. This design allows maximum airflow around the plant by minimizing contact between the plant and the support structure. In long-term aeroponic cultivation, it is crucial to ensure that the root systems are unconstrained, allowing unrestricted growth, root expansion, unhindered access to pure water, adequate air exchange, and disease-free conditions.

=== Benefits of oxygen in the root zone ===
Adequate oxygen (O_{2}) availability in the rhizosphere (root zone) is essential for promoting healthy plant growth. In aeroponics, where plants are grown in an environment of air and micro-droplets of water, almost any plant can thrive and reach maturity with an abundant supply of oxygen, water, and nutrients.

Some growers prefer aeroponic systems over other hydroponic methods, since the increased aeration of the nutrient solution provides greater oxygenation to the plant roots, stimulating growth and aiding in the prevention of pathogen formation.

Clean air plays a crucial role in purifying the environment for plants in aeroponics. Unrestricted access to air is necessary for natural plant growth and successful physiological development. If the support structure restricts the plant's natural growth, it can increase the risk of plant damage and subsequent disease formation.

Researchers have utilized aeroponics to study the impact of gas composition in the root zone on plant performance. Soffer and Burger (1988) conducted a study on the effects of dissolved oxygen concentrations in a system they termed "aero-hydroponics," which involved a 3-tier hydro and aero system with distinct zones within the root area. Their results indicated that dissolved oxygen is crucial for root formation. Additionally, they found that in the misted section, where nutrient mist was provided, the number and length of roots were consistently greater compared to the submerged or un-misted sections. Even at the lowest oxygen concentration tested, the misted section demonstrated successful root development.

=== Other benefits of air (CO_{2}) ===
Aeroponics also entails the management of CO_{2} levels in the system's air, which subsequently impacts the rate of photosynthesis in plants.

Utilizing artificial lights for growth offers advantages such as increased growth rates and enhanced reliability compared to solar lighting. This lighting method can be effectively combined with aeroponics to optimize plant growth.

=== Disease-free cultivation ===
Aeroponics offers the advantage of limiting disease transmission since it reduces plant-to-plant contact, and each spray pulse can be kept sterile. In contrast, diseases can easily spread throughout soil, aggregate, or other growing media, affecting multiple plants. Traditional greenhouses often require sterilization of solid media after each crop, and sometimes these media are simply discarded and replaced with fresh, sterile ones.

One significant benefit of aeroponic technology is the ability to quickly remove a diseased plant from the plant support structure without disrupting or infecting other plants, thanks to the isolated nature of the system.

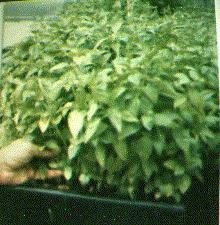
The first successful cultivation of basil from seed in an aeroponic system inside a modern greenhouse was achieved in 1986.

Due to the disease-free environment unique to aeroponics, many plants can be grown at higher densities (plants per square meter) compared to more traditional cultivation methods like hydroponics, soil, and Nutrient Film Technique (NFT). Commercial aeroponic systems incorporate hardware features that accommodate the expanding root systems of crops.

Researchers have highlighted aeroponics as a valuable, simple, and rapid method for preliminary screening of genotypes for resistance to specific seedling blights or root rots. The isolating nature of aeroponic systems enables researchers to avoid complications encountered when studying these infections in soil cultures.

=== Water and nutrient hydro-atomization ===
Aeroponic equipment employs sprayers, misters, foggers, or other devices to create a fine mist of solution for delivering nutrients to plant roots. Aeroponic systems are typically closed-looped systems designed to provide macro and micro-environments that sustain reliable and consistent air cultures. Several inventions have been developed to facilitate aeroponic spraying and misting. The size of the water droplet is critical for root development in an aeroponic environment. In commercial applications, a 360° hydro-atomizing spray is used, which utilizes air pressure misting to cover large areas of roots.

A variation of the mist technique, known as fogponics, utilizes ultrasonic foggers to mist nutrient solutions in low-pressure aeroponic devices.

Water droplet size plays a vital role in maintaining aeroponic growth. Water droplets that are too large can limit the availability of oxygen to the root system. Conversely, excessively fine water droplets generated by ultrasonic misters can lead to excessive root hair growth without developing a lateral root system necessary for sustained growth in an aeroponic system.

Mineralization of ultrasonic transducers requires maintenance and presents a potential risk of component failure. This is also a drawback of metal spray jets and misters. Restricted access to water can cause plants to lose turgidity and wilt.

=== Advanced materials ===
NASA has provided funding for research and development of new advanced materials aimed at improving the reliability and reducing maintenance in aeroponics. It has been determined that a high-pressure hydro-atomized mist with micro-droplets ranging from 5 to 50 micrometers is necessary for sustained aeroponic growth.

To ensure long-term growth, the mist system must possess significant pressure to effectively penetrate the dense root system(s). Achieving repeatability is crucial in aeroponics, and this includes maintaining the appropriate hydro-atomized droplet size. The degradation of the spray caused by mineralization of mist heads hampers the delivery of the water nutrient solution, resulting in an environmental imbalance within the air culture system.

To address this issue, special low-mass polymer materials have been developed and are utilized to prevent mineralization in the next generation of hydro-atomizing misting and spray jets. These materials help maintain the efficiency and effectiveness of the misting system.

=== Nutrient uptake ===
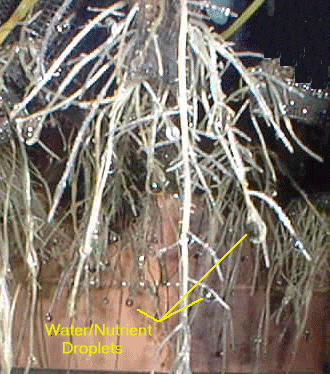
Close-up of roots grown from wheat seed using aeroponics, 1998

The discrete nature of interval and duration aeroponics allows for the measurement of nutrient uptake over time, even under varying conditions. Barak et al. conducted a study using an aeroponic system to non-destructively measure water and ion uptake rates in cranberries (Barak, Smith et al. 1996).

In their research, the team found that by measuring the concentrations and volumes of input and efflux solutions, they could accurately calculate the nutrient uptake rate. To validate their findings, they compared the results with N-isotope measurements. Once their analytical method was verified, Barak et al. proceeded to gather additional data specific to cranberries. This included studying diurnal variations in nutrient uptake, examining the correlation between ammonium uptake and proton efflux, and exploring the relationship between ion concentration and uptake. These findings highlight the potential of aeroponics not only as a valuable research tool for studying nutrient uptake but also as a means to monitor plant health and optimize crop cultivation in closed environments.

Atomization at pressures exceeding 65 pounds per square inch (450 kPa) increases the bioavailability of nutrients. Consequently, nutrient strength must be significantly reduced to prevent leaf and root burn. It's worth noting the large water droplets in the photo on the right, which indicate that the feed cycle may be too long or the pause cycle too short. Both scenarios discourage lateral root growth and root hair development. Optimal results are achieved when feed cycles are as short as possible, with roots remaining slightly damp but never excessively dry. A typical feed/pause cycle is less than 2 seconds of feeding followed by approximately 1.5–2 minutes of pause, maintained continuously. However, when an accumulator system is incorporated, cycle times can be further reduced to less than approximately 1 second of feeding and around 1 minute of pause.

=== As a research tool ===
Shortly after its development, aeroponics emerged as a valuable research tool, providing researchers with a non-invasive method to examine developing roots. This innovative technology expanded the possibilities for conducting experiments by offering a larger number of parameters and a wider range of experimental conditions.

The precise control over root zone moisture levels and water delivery makes aeroponics particularly well-suited for studying water stress. K. Hubick evaluated aeroponics as a means to consistently produce plants with minimal water stress, which can be utilized in drought or flood physiology experiments.

Aeroponics are a better choice when it comes to investigating root morphology. The absence of aggregates enables researchers to easily access the entire, intact root structure without causing damage that may occur when removing roots from soils or aggregates. It has been observed that aeroponics yields more natural root systems compared to hydroponics.

== Terminology ==
Aeroponic cultivation involves growing plants in an air culture, allowing them to develop and grow naturally.

Aeroponic growth specifically refers to the process of growing plants in an air culture.

An aeroponic system refers to the collection of hardware and components designed to support plant growth in an air culture.

An aeroponic greenhouse is a controlled environment structure made of glass or plastic, equipped with the necessary tools to cultivate plants in an air/mist environment.

Aeroponic conditions pertain to the specific environmental parameters required to sustain plant growth in an air culture, tailored to the needs of a particular plant species.

Aeroponic roots refer to the root system that develops when plants are grown in an air culture.

== Types of aeroponics ==
=== Low-pressure units ===
In most low-pressure aeroponic gardens, the plant roots are suspended above a reservoir of nutrient solution or inside a channel connected to a reservoir. A low-pressure pump is used to deliver the nutrient solution either through jets or ultrasonic transducers, and the excess solution then drips or drains back into the reservoir. However, as plants mature in these units, it is common for certain sections of the root systems to become dry, which hinders proper nutrient uptake. These units typically lack the necessary features to purify the nutrient solution and effectively remove inconsistencies, debris, and harmful pathogens. Due to their cost constraints, such units are often more suitable for small-scale benchtop growing and for demonstrating the principles of aeroponics.

=== High-pressure devices ===
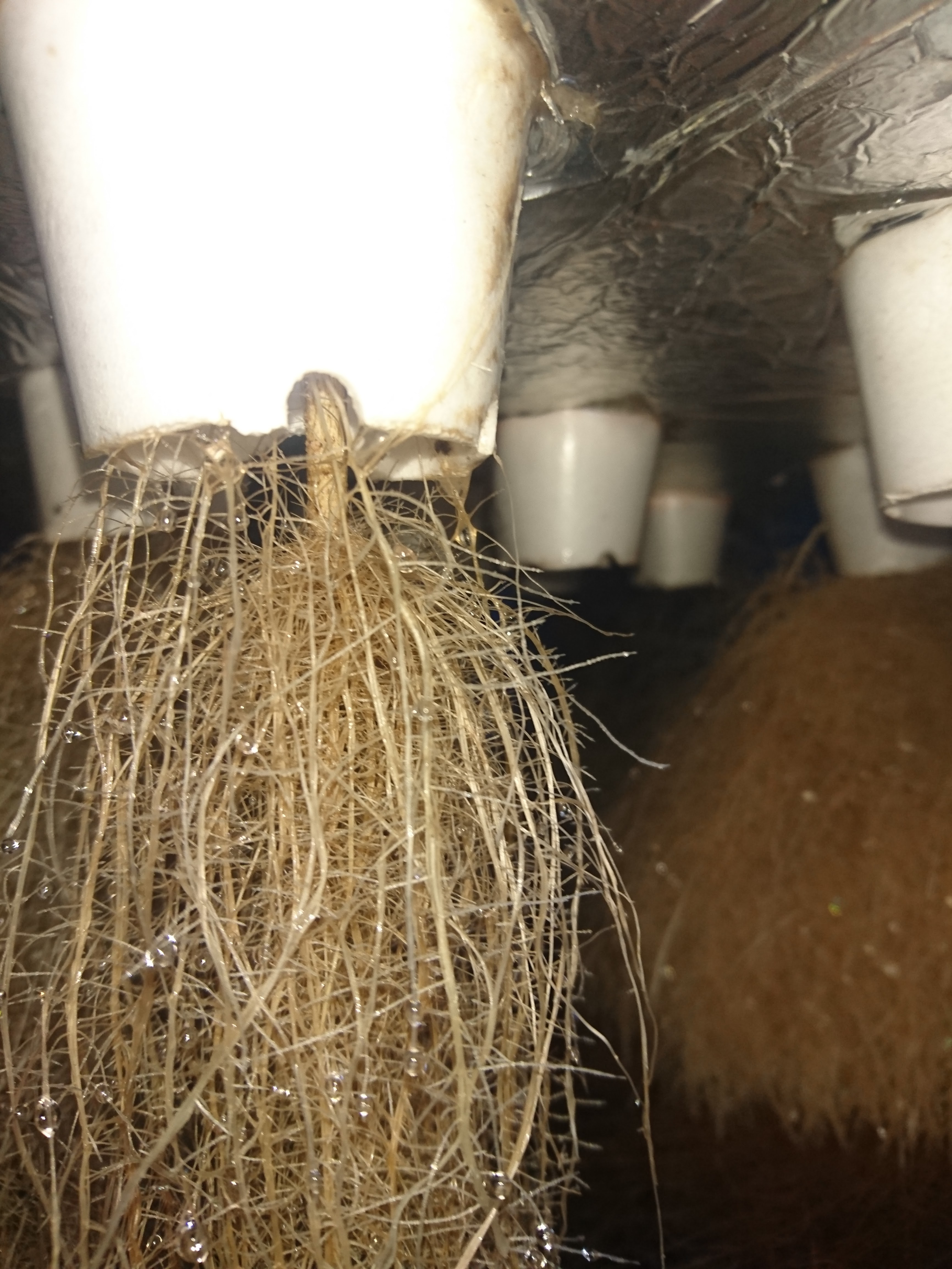
Roots inside a High-pressure Aeroponics System

High-pressure aeroponic techniques, which employ mist generation through high-pressure pump(s), are commonly employed in the cultivation of high value crops and plant specimens. The benefits of using this method in horticulture can compensate for the higher setup costs involved.

High-pressure aeroponic systems incorporate advanced technologies for air and water purification, nutrient sterilization, the utilization of low-mass polymers, and pressurized nutrient delivery systems. These features enhance the efficiency and effectiveness of the aeroponic setup.

=== Commercial systems ===
Commercial aeroponic systems comprise high-pressure device hardware along with biological systems. The biological systems matrix incorporates various enhancements aimed at extending plant life and promoting crop maturation.

Biological subsystems and hardware components encompass several features and functionalities, such as effluent control systems, disease prevention measures, pathogen resistance mechanisms, precise timing and pressurization of nutrient solutions, sensors for heating and cooling, thermal control of solutions, efficient light arrays with optimized photon flux, spectrum filtration capabilities, fail-safe sensors and protection mechanisms, reduced maintenance and labor-saving features, as well as ergonomic design and long-term reliability features.

These commercial aeroponic systems, including the high-pressure devices, are primarily utilized for cultivating high-value crops, enabling multiple crop rotations on a continuous commercial scale.

Advanced commercial systems go a step further by incorporating data gathering, monitoring, analytical feedback, and internet connectivity to various subsystems, enhancing overall efficiency and productivity.

== History ==
3D Diagram of Standalone Commercial Aeroponics System, 2020

In 1911, V.M. Artsikhovski published an article titled "On Air Plant Cultures" in the journal "Experienced Agronomy." In this article, he introduced his method of conducting physiological studies on root systems by spraying various substances in the surrounding air, which is now known as the aeroponics method. Artsikhovski designed the first aeroponic systems and demonstrated their effectiveness for plant cultivation.

In 1942, W. Carter conducted pioneering research on air culture growing and described a method for growing plants in water vapor to facilitate root examination. Since 2006, aeroponics has been widely used in agriculture worldwide.

In 1944, L.J. Klotz made an important discovery by misting citrus plants, which facilitated his research on diseases affecting citrus and avocado roots. In 1952, G.F. Trowel successfully grew apple trees using a spray culture technique.

In 1957, F. W. Went coined the term "aeroponics" to describe the air-growing process. He grew coffee plants and tomatoes with air-suspended roots, nourishing them through the application of a nutrient mist to the root section.

=== Genesis Machine, 1983 ===
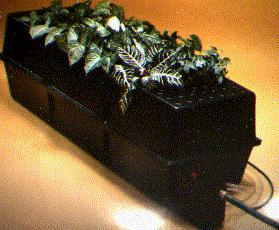
GTi's Genesis Rooting System, 1983

The first commercially available aeroponic apparatus was manufactured and brought to market by GTi in 1983. At that time, it was named the Genesis Machine, inspired by the film Star Trek II: The Wrath of Khan. The Genesis Machine was marketed as the "Genesis Rooting System."

GTi's device featured an open-loop water-driven system controlled by a microchip. It delivered a high-pressure hydro-atomized nutrient spray within an aeroponic chamber. The Genesis Machine was designed to be connected to a water faucet and an electrical outlet, providing the necessary resources for operation.

=== Aeroponic propagation (cloning) ===
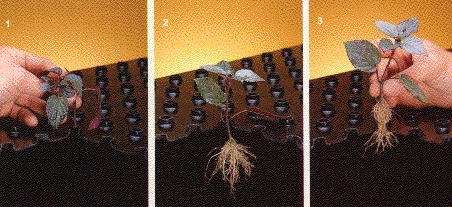
GTi's apparatus cut-away of vegetative cutting propagated aeroponically, achieved 1983

Aeroponic culturing has brought about a revolution in cloning (vegetative propagation) of plants. It has made the propagation of numerous plants, previously considered difficult or impossible, much easier through stem cuttings in aeroponics. Delicate hardwoods and cacti, which were sensitive to bacterial infections when propagated through cuttings, can now be successfully propagated in aeroponic systems. The success of propagation in aeroponics can be attributed to the highly aerated environment around the roots, promoting root hair development (Soffer and Burger, 1988), as well as enhanced root and overall growth due to nutrient supply through the aeroponic system (Santos and Fisher, 2009). Additionally, the absence of rooting media reduces the risk of root diseases (Mehandru et al., 2014).

Aeroponics plays a crucial role in propagating plants that have low success rates in vegetative propagation, plants with significant medicinal uses, high-demand plants, and in creating new cultivars of specific plant species. For instance, Leptadenia reticulata, an important medicinal plant with low reproductive rates through both seeds and cuttings, has found easier propagation through aeroponics (Mehandru et al., 2014). Aeroponics has also contributed to the availability of elm trees, including Ulmus Americana cultivars, which were severely affected by Dutch elm disease (Oakes et al., 2012).

Aeroponics serves as a more advantageous alternative to the traditional method of using overhead misters (Peterson et al., 2018). It boasts a higher success rate compared to overhead misters, which have drawbacks such as the need for large volumes of water, potential unsanitary conditions, uneven misting coverage, and possible leaching of foliar nutrients (Peterson et al., 2018). In essence, cloning has become easier with the use of aeroponic apparatus, as it initiates faster and cleaner root development through a sterile, nutrient-rich, highly oxygenated, and moist environment (Hughes, 1983).

=== Air-rooted transplants ===
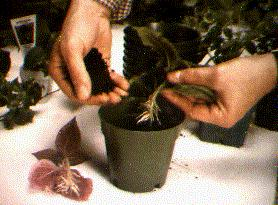
Cloned aeroponics transplanted directly into soil

Aeroponics has made significant advancements in tissue culture technology, enabling faster plant cloning and reducing the labor-intensive steps associated with traditional tissue culture techniques. One of the notable benefits of aeroponics is its ability to eliminate the need for stage I and stage II plantings into soil, which has been a challenge for tissue culture growers. In tissue culture, plants are initially planted in sterile media (stage I) and then transferred to sterile soil (stage II) before eventually being transplanted to field soil. This entire process is not only labor-intensive but also prone to disease, infection, and failure.

By utilizing aeroponics, growers can directly clone and transplant air-rooted plants into field soil. The aeroponic roots are more resistant to wilting, leaf loss, and transplant shock compared to traditional methods like hydroponics. Moreover, air-rooted plants tend to be healthier and less susceptible to pathogen infections. However, it is important to maintain the root chamber's relative humidity (RH) below 70 °F (21 °C) to prevent the development of issues like fungus gnats, algae, and anaerobic bacteria.

The efforts of GTi in developing an all-plastic aeroponic method and apparatus controlled by a microprocessor have ushered in a new era of artificial life support for plants, allowing them to grow naturally without the use of soil or traditional hydroponics. In fact, GTi obtained a patent for their innovative aeroponic system in 1985.

Aeroponics has gained recognition as a time- and cost-saving technique. The economic application of aeroponics in agriculture is under development in the 21st century.

=== Genesis Growing System, 1985 ===
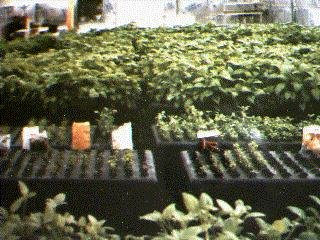
GTi's Aeroponic Growing System greenhouse facility, 1985

In 1985, GTi unveiled the second generation of aeroponics hardware, known as the "Genesis Growing System". This new apparatus represented a significant advancement in aeroponics technology as it introduced a closed-loop system. The Genesis Growing System utilized recycled effluent, which was precisely controlled by a microprocessor. With this innovation, aeroponics expanded its capabilities to include supporting seed germination, making GTi's system the world's first plant and harvest aeroponic system.

It is worth noting that many of these early open-loop and closed-loop aeroponic systems continue to operate successfully to this day.

=== Commercialization ===
Aeroponics made its transition from laboratories to the commercial cultivation sector. In 1966, Bruce Briggs, a pioneer in commercial aeroponics, successfully induced roots on hardwood cuttings through air-rooting. He discovered that air-rooted cuttings were more robust and hardened compared to those formed in soil, and concluded that air-rooting was a sound principle. Briggs also found that air-rooted trees could be transplanted to soil without experiencing transplant shock, which is often observed in hydroponic transplants.

In 1982, Isaac Nir in Israel developed a patent for an aeroponic apparatus that utilized compressed low-pressure air to deliver a nutrient solution to suspended plants held by a perforated layer of plastic foam material styrofoam inside large metal containers.

In 1976, British researcher John Prewer conducted a series of aeroponic experiments in the UK, where lettuces were grown from seed to maturity in 22 days using polyethylene film tubes. The fog droplets used in these experiments were generated by equipment supplied by Mee Industries of California. In collaboration with John Prewer, a commercial grower named Kings Nurseries on the Isle of Wight used a different design of aeroponics system in 1984 to grow strawberry plants. The strawberries flourished, yielding a bountiful crop that was highly appreciated by customers, especially the elderly, who valued the cleanliness, quality, and flavor of the fruit, as well as the convenience of picking it without stooping.

In 1983, Richard Stoner filed a patent for the first microprocessor interface designed to deliver tap water and nutrients into an enclosed aeroponic chamber made of plastic. Stoner subsequently established several companies dedicated to researching and advancing aeroponic hardware, interfaces, biocontrols, and components for commercial aeroponic crop production.

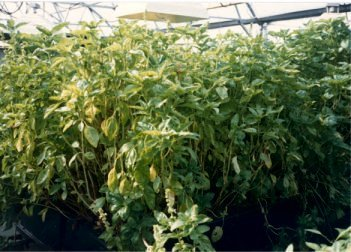
In 1986, the first commercial aeroponic greenhouse for food production was established.

Stoner's company, Genesis Technology Inc, played a pioneering role in manufacturing, marketing, and applying large-scale closed-loop aeroponic systems in greenhouses for commercial crop production.

In the 1990s, General Hydroponics [Europe] (GHE) attempted to introduce aeroponics to the hobby hydroponics market and introduced the Aerogarden system. Although the Aerogarden did not meet the criteria of "true" aeroponics as it produced droplets instead of a fine mist, it created a demand for aeroponic growing in the hobby market. The distinction between mist aeroponics and droplet aeroponics became blurred in the eyes of many. However, a UK firm called Nutriculture conducted trials of true mist aeroponics, which showed positive results compared to traditional growing techniques like Nutrient Film Technique (NFT) and Ebb & Flood. Despite the drawbacks of cost and maintenance, Nutriculture developed a scalable, easy-to-use droplet-aeroponic system called the Amazon, acknowledging that better results could be achieved by propagating plants in their branded X-stream aeroponic propagator and then transferring them to the specially designed droplet-aeroponic growing system.

=== Aeroponically grown food ===
In 1986, Stoner achieved a significant milestone by becoming the first person to successfully market fresh aeroponically grown food to a national grocery chain. His accomplishment garnered attention, and he was invited for an interview on NPR, where he highlighted the significance of aeroponics in terms of water conservation, both in modern agriculture and even in space exploration.

== Aeroponics in space ==
=== Space plants ===
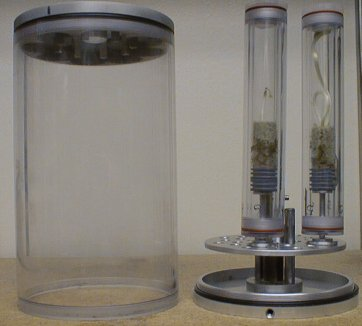
NASA life support GAP technology with untreated beans (left tube) and biocontrol treated beans (right tube) returned from the Mir space station aboard the space shuttle – September 1997

Plants had their first encounters with Earth's orbit back in 1960 during two separate missions, namely Sputnik 4 and Discoverer 17 (for a comprehensive review of plant growth in space during the first 30 years, refer to Halstead and Scott, 1990). The Sputnik 4 mission involved carrying seeds of wheat, pea, maize, spring onion, and Nigella damascena, while Chlorella pyrenoidosa cells were taken into orbit on the Discoverer 17 mission.

Following these early endeavors, plant experiments were conducted on various missions involving Bangladesh, China, and joint Soviet-American efforts, including Biosatellite II, Skylab 3 and 4, Apollo-Soyuz, Sputnik, Vostok, and Zond. Initial research findings shed light on how low gravity affected the orientation of roots and shoots (Halstead and Scott, 1990).

Subsequent research delved into investigating the impact of low gravity on plants at different levels, such as organismic, cellular, and subcellular. At the organismic level, several species including pine, oat, mung bean, lettuce, cress, and Arabidopsis thaliana exhibited decreased seedling, root, and shoot growth under low gravity conditions. However, lettuce grown on the Cosmos mission showed the opposite effect, displaying enhanced growth in space (Halstead and Scott, 1990). Mineral uptake in plants grown in space was also found to be affected. For instance, peas grown in space demonstrated increased levels of phosphorus and potassium, while the divalent cations calcium, magnesium, manganese, zinc, and iron exhibited decreased levels (Halstead and Scott, 1990).

=== Biocontrols in space ===
In 1996, Richard Stoner's research on organic disease control (ODC) received funding from NASA. The goal was to develop a natural liquid biocontrol solution for closed-loop hydroponic systems that could prevent plant diseases and increase yields without the need for pesticides. By 1997, NASA conducted biocontrol experiments with Stoner's ODC solution. The experiments took place using BioServe Space Technologies' GAP technology, which consisted of miniature growth chambers. Bean seeds were treated with the ODC solution in triplicate experiments conducted aboard the MIR space station, at the Kennedy Space Center, and at Colorado State University under total darkness conditions to eliminate light as a variable. The focus of the NASA experiment was solely on studying the benefits of the biocontrol.

Results from NASA's enclosed environment bean experiments on the MIR space station and shuttle confirmed that ODC promoted increased germination rates, better sprouting, enhanced growth, and activated natural plant disease mechanisms. Although initially developed for NASA, ODC is not limited to space applications. Soil and hydroponics growers can also incorporate ODC into their planting techniques, as it complies with USDA NOP standards for organic farming.

One notable example of ODC's expansion in agriculture is its application in the cannabis industry. The ODC product line has been developed specifically for emerging agricultural crops like cannabis. The active ingredients in the ODC cannabis line include the original chitosan ingredient at a concentration of 0.25%, as well as 0.28% colloidal nitrogen and 0.05% calcium.

In order to enhance the resilience of hydroponic and aeroponic systems against plant diseases and reduce reliance on chemical additives, NASA explores the integration of environmental biocontrols into the design of these systems. The Advanced Plant Habitat (APA), deployed on the International Space Station (ISS) since 2018, exemplifies this approach. Equipped with over 180 sensors, the APA optimizes plant growth and health while decreasing the need for chemical additive biocontrols. The sensors monitor various environmental factors, including lighting intensity, spectrum, and photoperiod, temperature, CO_{2} levels, relative humidity, irrigation, as well as plant-derived ethylene and volatile organic compound (VOC) scrubbing. Additionally, the APA features leaf and root zone temperature sensors, root zone moisture sensors, and oxygen concentration meters.

These environmental controls serve two main purposes in inhibiting plant diseases. Firstly, they maintain environmental conditions that directly hinder the growth of diseases, fungi, and pests. By carefully regulating factors like temperature and humidity, the risk of infections, such as botrytis in leaves, is reduced as the environment becomes less conducive to disease proliferation. Secondly, these controls create conditions that promote the plant's natural disease prevention mechanisms, indirectly inhibiting the effects of plant diseases. For instance, experiments with peppers conducted under blue light conditions have shown increased resilience to powdery mildew.

=== Aeroponics for Earth and space ===
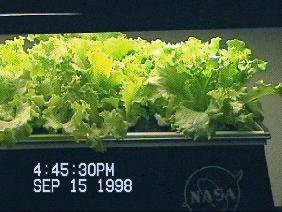
NASA aeroponic lettuce seed germination. Day 30.

In 1998, Stoner received funding from NASA to develop a high-performance aeroponic system suitable for use on Earth as well as in space. Through his research, Stoner demonstrated significant increases in growth rates of lettuce plants cultivated in aeroponic systems compared to other cultivation techniques. NASA subsequently adopted many of the aeroponic advancements developed by Stoner.

Research efforts have focused on identifying and developing technologies for rapid plant growth in different gravitational environments. Low-gravity environments present challenges such as efficient delivery of water and nutrients to plants, as well as the recovery of waste products. Food production in space also requires addressing issues like water management, minimizing water usage, and reducing system weight. Additionally, future food production on planetary bodies like the Moon and Mars will involve dealing with reduced gravity environments. Given the varying fluid dynamics at different levels of gravity, optimizing nutrient delivery systems has been a major focus in developing plant growth systems.

Various nutrient delivery methods are currently employed, both on Earth and in low-gravity environments. Substrate-dependent methods include traditional soil cultivation, zeoponics, agar, and nutrient-loaded ion exchange resins. In addition to substrate-dependent approaches, non-soil methods have been developed, including the nutrient film technique, ebb and flow, aeroponics, and others. Hydroponic systems, with their high nutrient solution throughput, can achieve rapid plant growth. However, this necessitates large volumes of water and significant recycling of the solution, which poses challenges for controlling solutions in microgravity conditions.

Aeroponic systems use hydro-atomized sprays to deliver nutrients, resulting in minimal water usage, enhanced root oxygenation, and excellent plant growth. The nutrient solution throughput of aeroponic systems is higher compared to other systems designed for low-gravity environments. Aeroponics eliminates the need for substrates and reduces the quantity of waste material that must be managed by other life support systems. By removing the substrate requirement, planting and harvesting processes are simplified, automation becomes easier, the weight and volume of expendable materials are reduced, and a potential pathway for pathogen transmission is eliminated. These advantages highlight the potential of aeroponic production in microgravity environments and its efficiency in food production for outer space.

=== NASA inflatable aeroponics ===
In 1999, NASA allocated funding to support the development of an inflatable low-mass aeroponic system (AIS) for high-performance food production in both space and on Earth. The AIS is a self-contained and self-supporting system designed to deliver nutrients and mist to plant roots in an aeroponic environment. Its inflatable structure offers the advantage of being lightweight and can be deflated to occupy less volume during transportation and storage. This current version of AIS represents an improvement over previous designs that utilized rigid structures, which tend to be more costly to manufacture and transport.

On Earth, the cost of materials and transportation can pose challenges to the economic viability of aeroponic systems for commercial growers. However, these challenges become even more pronounced when considering the limitations imposed by payload mass for space transportation.

To overcome these limitations, NASA has developed specialized materials capable of withstanding the harsh space environment for inflatable habitats and structures. These materials, similar to aramid fibers, are currently being utilized in the development of expandable habitats by Bigelow Aerospace. Successful tests have been conducted in space with one of Bigelow's Expandable Activity Modules, demonstrating the feasibility of such inflatable structures in the space environment.

== Benefits of aeroponics for earth and space ==
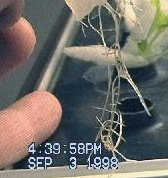
NASA aeroponic lettuce seed germination- Day 3

Aeroponics possesses numerous characteristics that contribute to its effectiveness and efficiency as a method of plant cultivation.

=== Less nutrient solution throughout ===
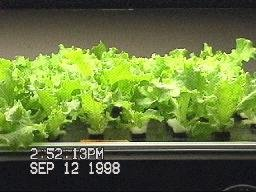
NASA aeroponic lettuce seed germination- Day 12

Plants grown using aeroponics spend 99.98% of their time in the air, with only 0.02% in direct contact with hydro-atomized nutrient solution. This minimal contact with water allows the roots to efficiently capture oxygen. Additionally, the hydro-atomized mist plays a significant role in effectively oxygenating the roots. A comparison between aeroponics and Nutrient Film Technique (NFT) reveals that aeroponics has a lower nutrient throughput of 1.5 milliliters per minute, in contrast to NFT's 1 liter per minute.

The reduced volume of nutrient throughput in aeroponics leads to a reduction in the overall amount of nutrients required for plant development.

Another advantage of the reduced throughput, particularly relevant for space applications, is the decreased water volume used. This reduction in water volume not only lightens the weight needed to sustain plant growth but also reduces the buffer volume. Additionally, the volume of effluent produced by the plants is minimized in aeroponics, resulting in a reduced amount of water that requires treatment for reuse.

The use of relatively small solution volumes in aeroponics, combined with the limited exposure of roots to the hydro-atomized mist, minimizes root-to-root contact and reduces the spread of pathogens among plants.

=== Greater control of plant environment ===
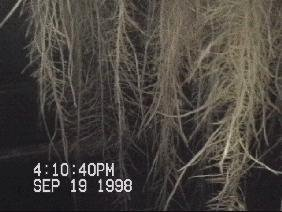
NASA aeroponic lettuce seed germination (close-up of root zone environment)- Day 19

Aeroponics provides greater control over the environment surrounding the root zone compared to other plant growth systems like hydroponics. In aeroponics, the plant roots are not continuously surrounded by any medium.

=== Improved nutrient feeding ===
Aeroponics offers the flexibility to administer various nutrient solutions to the root zone without the need to flush out previous solutions or matrices. This high level of control is particularly valuable for studying the impact of different nutrient regimens on specific plant species. Moreover, aeroponics enables a wider range of growth conditions compared to other nutrient delivery systems. For instance, the interval and duration of nutrient sprays can be finely adjusted to meet the specific requirements of a plant species. This means that the aboveground tissue can experience a different environment from that of the roots.

=== More user-friendly ===
The design of an aeroponic system enables convenient handling of plants. This is due to the individual separation of plants and their suspension in the air, free from any matrix that could entrap the roots. As a result, harvesting each plant becomes a straightforward task. Similarly, removing any infected plant is easily done without the risk of uprooting or contaminating nearby plants.

=== More cost effective ===
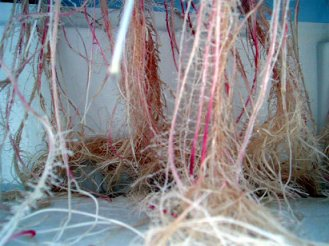
Close-up of aeroponically grown corn and roots inside an aeroponic (air-culture) apparatus, 2005

Aeroponic systems offer cost-effective advantages compared to other systems. The reduced volume of solution throughput, as mentioned earlier, translates to lower water and nutrient requirements in the system. Additionally, the elimination of substrates and the need for many moving parts contribute to cost savings.

=== Use of seed stocks ===
Aeroponics offers a solution to minimize the negative impact of pathogens in seed stocks. As previously mentioned, the separation of plants and the absence of a shared growth matrix contribute to this advantage. Moreover, aeroponics provides an enclosed and controlled environment, making it an ideal system for growing pathogen-free seed stocks. The enclosed growth chamber, combined with the isolation of plants from each other, serves to prevent initial contamination from external pathogens and limits the spread of any existing pathogens among plants.

== 21st century aeroponics ==
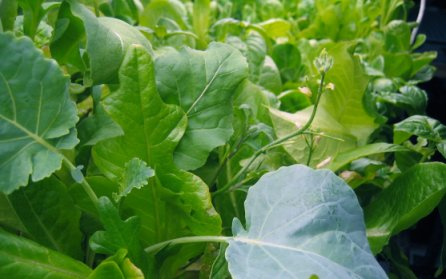
Modern aeroponics allows high density companion planting of many food and horticultural crops without the use of pesticides - due to unique discoveries aboard the space shuttle

Aeroponics represents a significant advancement in artificial life support for plants, offering benefits such as non-damaging plant support, efficient seed germination, precise environmental control, and unrestricted growth. In comparison to traditional agricultural techniques like hydroponics and drip irrigation, which have been in use for decades, aeroponics provides notable improvements in plant cultivation.

=== Contemporary aeroponics ===
Contemporary aeroponic techniques have been extensively researched at NASA's BioServe Space Technologies ( ) located on the campus of the University of Colorado in Boulder, Colorado. This research center focuses on the development and commercialization of aeroponic systems. Additionally, scientists at Ames Research Center have conducted research on enclosed loop systems, investigating methods for growing food crops in low-gravity environments to support future space colonization efforts.

In 2000, Stoner was granted a patent for his organic disease control biocontrol technology, which enables pesticide-free cultivation in aeroponic systems.

A notable milestone in aeroponics occurred in 2004 when Ed Harwood, the founder of AeroFarms, invented an innovative aeroponic system that utilizes micro fleece cloth to grow lettuces. AeroFarms, leveraging Harwood's patented aeroponic technology, currently operates the largest indoor vertical farm in the world based on its annual growing capacity in Newark, New Jersey. This state-of-the-art farm employs aeroponic technology to produce and distribute up to two million pounds of pesticide-free leafy greens each year.

=== Aeroponic bio-pharming ===
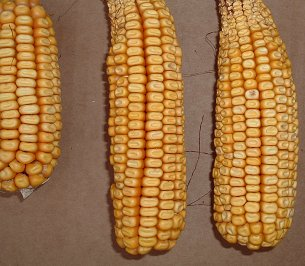
Aeroponically grown biopharma corn, 2005

Aeroponic bio-pharming is an innovative approach used to cultivate pharmaceutical medicines within plants. This technology provides complete containment, ensuring that effluents and by-products of biopharma crops are confined within a closed-loop facility. In a notable development in 2005, Dr. Neil Reese of South Dakota State University conducted GMO research using aeroponics to grow genetically modified corn.

Dr. Reese considers it a significant achievement to successfully grow corn in an aeroponic system for bio-massing. Previous attempts at growing various types of corn using hydroponics had been unsuccessful.

Through the implementation of advanced aeroponics techniques, Dr. Reese was able to harvest mature ears of genetically modified corn while effectively containing the corn pollen and spent effluent water, thus preventing their release into the environment. This containment ensures that the surrounding environment remains free from GMO contamination.

Dr. Reese emphasizes that aeroponics offers the potential for economically viable bio-pharming practices, making it a promising avenue for pharmaceutical production.

=== Large scale integration of aeroponics ===
In 2006, the Institute of Biotechnology at Vietnam National University of Agriculture, in collaboration with Stoner, established a postgraduate doctoral program focused on aeroponics. The Agrobiotech Research Center, led by Professor Nguyen Quang Thach, is utilizing aeroponic laboratories to advance Vietnam's minituber potato production for certified seed potato cultivation.

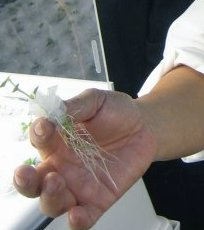
Aeroponic potato explants on day 3 after insertion in the aeroponic system, Hanoi

This development holds significant historical importance as it marks the first time a nation has specifically prioritized aeroponics to bolster its agricultural sector, promote economic growth in farming, meet rising demands, improve food quality, and increase overall production.

"We have shown that aeroponics, more than any other form of agricultural technology, will significantly improve Vietnam's potato production. We have very little tillable land, aeroponics makes complete economic sense to us," affirmed Thach.

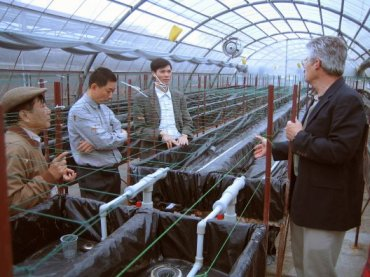
Aeroponic greenhouse for potato minituber product Hanoi 2006

The integration of aeroponics in Vietnamese agriculture begins with the production of low-cost, certified disease-free organic minitubers. These minitubers then serve as a local supply for farmers engaged in field plantings of seed potatoes and commercial potatoes. The adoption of aeroponics will benefit potato farmers by providing them with disease-free seed potatoes grown without the use of pesticides. Importantly, it will also reduce their operational costs and increase their yields, according to Thach.

== See also ==
- Aerial root
- Plant nutrition
