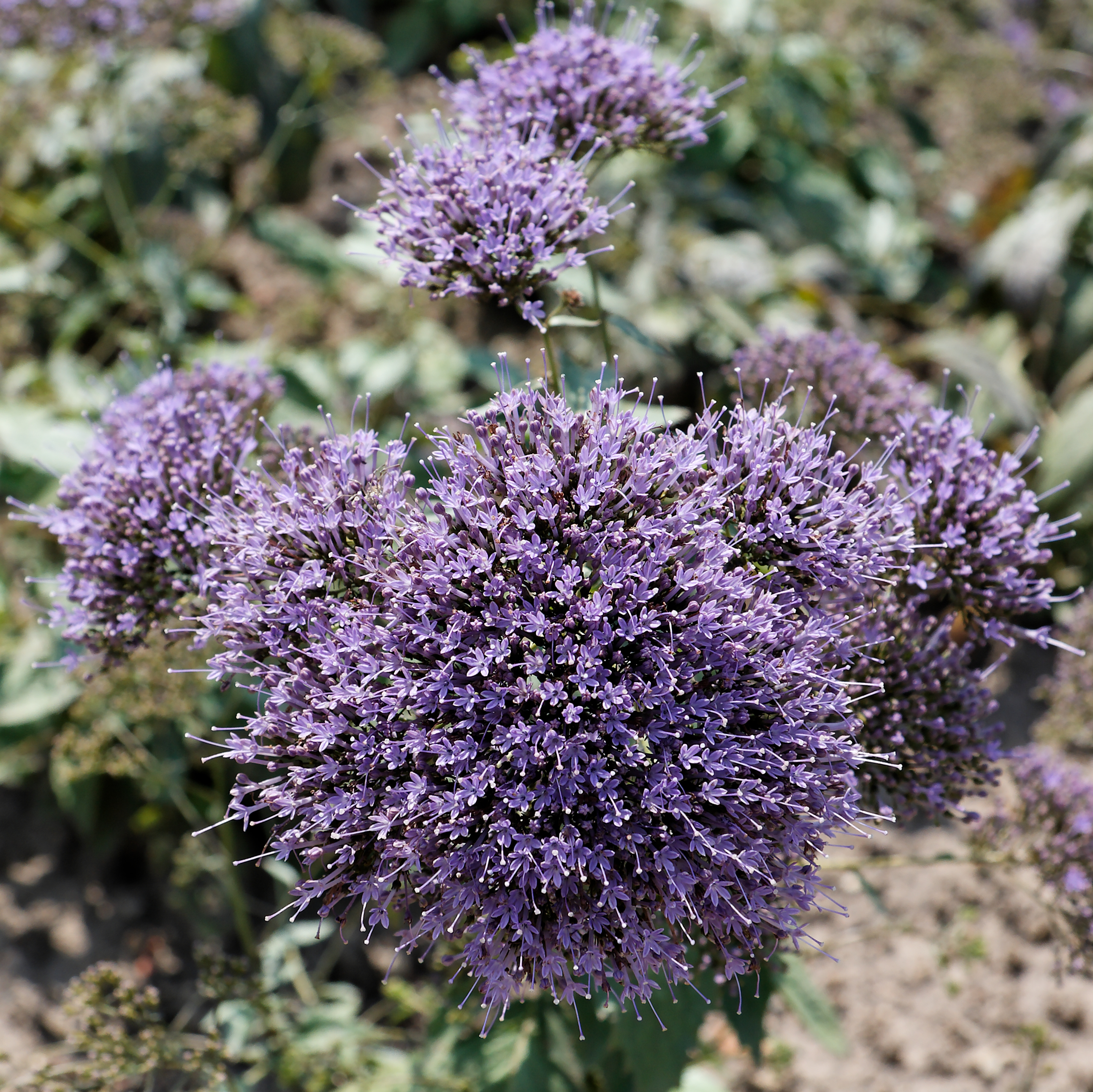

Scientific classification
- Kingdom: Plantae
- Clade: Tracheophytes
- Clade: Angiosperms
- Clade: Eudicots
- Clade: Asterids
- Order: Asterales
- Family: Campanulaceae
- Genus: Trachelium
- Species: T. caeruleum

Binomial name
- Trachelium caeruleum L.

= Trachelium caeruleum =

Species of flowering plant

Trachelium caeruleum, common name blue throatwort, is a species of flowering plant in the family Campanulaceae native to the Mediterranean, where its native range includes Algeria, Morocco, Portugal, Spain, and Sicily. It has also become naturalized in a few areas, including New Zealand, the Azores, and parts of mainland Europe.

Growing to 120 cm (47 in) tall by 30 cm (12 in) wide, it is a woody-based erect herbaceous perennial, with oval leaves and dense cushions of violet-purple flowers in summer. The specific epithet caeruleum means "dark blue".

In temperate climates this plant is usually grown as a half-hardy annual for summer bedding schemes or planters. It has gained the Royal Horticultural Society's Award of Garden Merit. There are many cultivars with a variety of flower colors, including white, red, pink, and dark purple.
