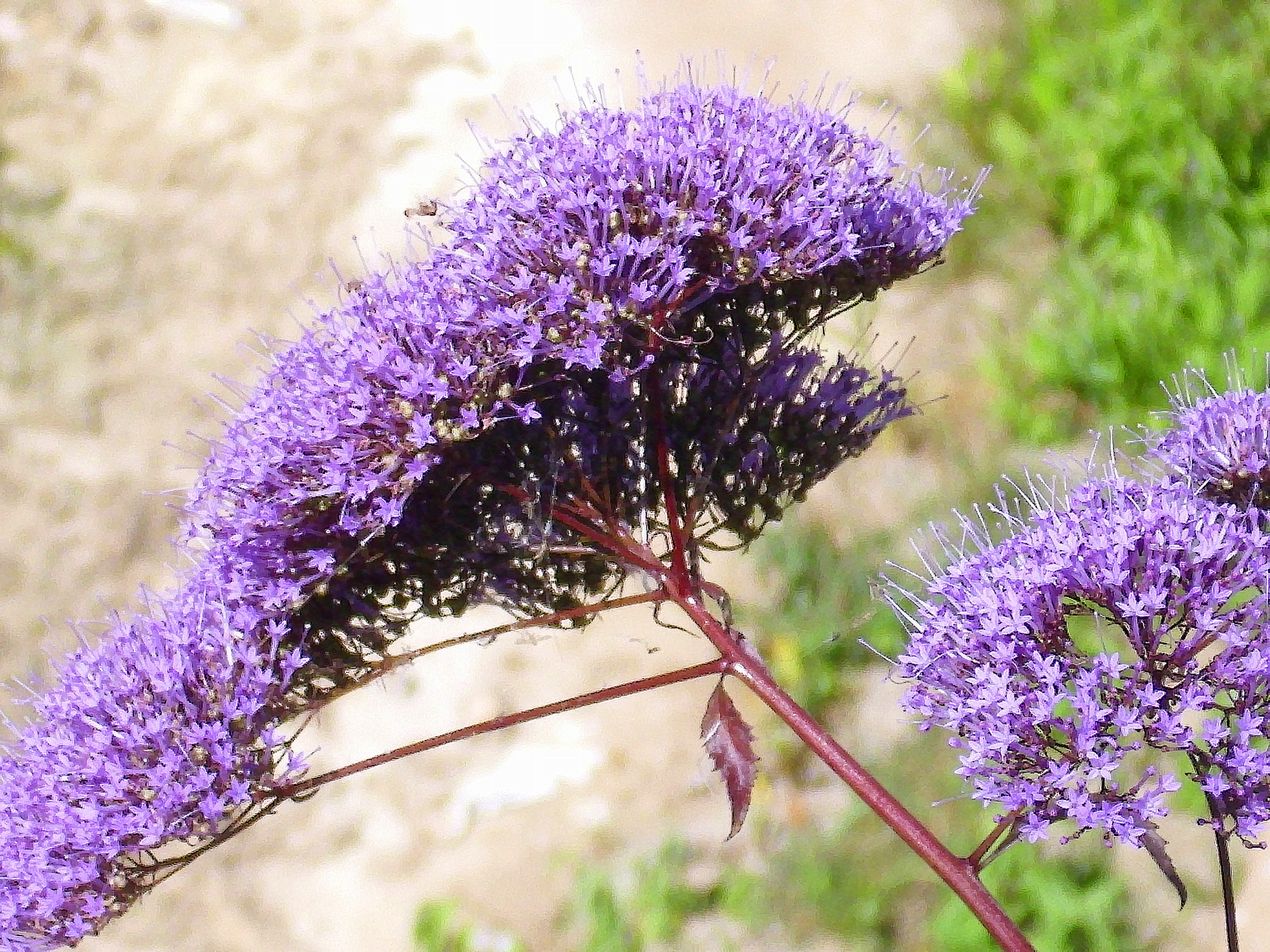
- Trachelium caeruleum

Scientific classification
- Kingdom: Plantae
- Clade: Tracheophytes
- Clade: Angiosperms
- Clade: Eudicots
- Clade: Asterids
- Order: Asterales
- Family: Campanulaceae
- Subfamily: Campanuloideae
- Genus: Trachelium; Tourn. ex L. (1753)

Species
- 3, see text

= Trachelium (plant) =

Genus of flowering plants

Trachelium is a genus of flowering plants in the family Campanulaceae. It includes two species and one natural hybrid native to Macaronesia and the western and central Mediterranean.

Trachelium caeruleum is cultivated as an ornamental plant.

== Species ==
- Trachelium caeruleum L. – blue throatwort
- Trachelium × halteratum (Bianca ex Ces., Pass. & Gibelli) Sandwith
- Trachelium lanceolatum Guss.

=== Formerly placed here ===
- Campanula asperuloides (Boiss. & Orph.) Harms (as Trachelium asperuloides Boiss. & Orph.)
- Campanula jacquinii (Sieber) A.DC. (as Trachelium jacquinii (Sieber) Boiss.)
