= Bedding (horticulture) =

Type of flowering plant

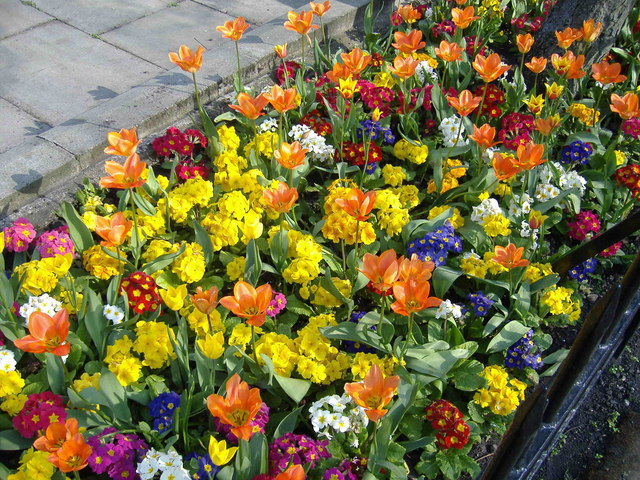
Tulips and polyanthus in spring, South Shields, England

In horticulture, the term bedding refers to flowering plants which can be planted in flower gardens and flower beds. These fast-growing plants in seasonal flower beds create colourful displays, during spring, summer, fall or winter, depending on the climate. Plants used for bedding are generally annuals, but biennials, tender perennials, and succulents are also used.

Flowering bedding plants are also grown in containers and pots positioned on patios, terraces, decks and other areas around houses. Large containers of bedding plants are used in public displays along city streets, plazas and hanging from city light posts.

== Types of gardens with bedding plants ==
Formal, large gardens of bedding plants, as seen in parks and municipal displays, where whole flower beds are replanted two or three times a year, is a costly and labor-intensive process. Towns and cities are encouraged to produce impressive displays by campaigns such as "Britain in bloom" or "America in Bloom". Home gardeners usually have bedding plants in containers or in beds in the front yard or back yard.

=== Spring, fall, winter gardens - temperatures are moderate to cool ===
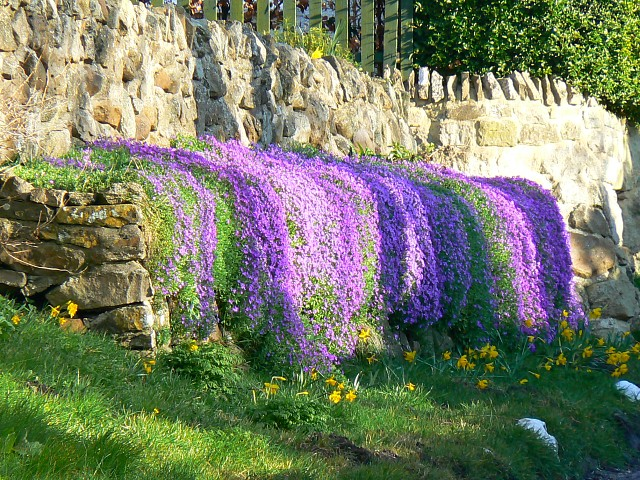
Aubrietia and daffodils, Badbury, Swindon

Plants used for spring bedding are often biennials (sown one year to flower the next), or hardy, but short-lived, perennials. Spring-flowering bulbs such as tulips are often used, typically with forget-me-nots, wallflowers, winter pansies and polyanthus. Hardy annuals sown directly into the ground early in the season (poppy, stock, sunflower, clarkia, godetia, eschscholzia, nigella, dianthus) or transplanted after purchase at a local garden centre. Hardy biennial plants, or perennials treated as biennials, sown in one year to flower the next, and discarded after flowering (antirrhinum, polyanthus, wallflower, daisy, foxglove, some dianthus, some poppies, campanula, delphinium, aubrieta, aquilegia, cornflower, pansies). Planted in autumn to give a display until early spring, the plants used for winter bedding are mainly hardy perennials. Spring flowering bulbs (tulip, narcissus, hyacinth, etc.) are also planted in the fall. Winter-hardy ornamental vegetables such as cultivars of kale and cabbage with coloured or variegated foliage are increasingly common. Primula cultivars (polyanthus and primroses) are commonly used, as are winter-flowering heathers and winter pansies.

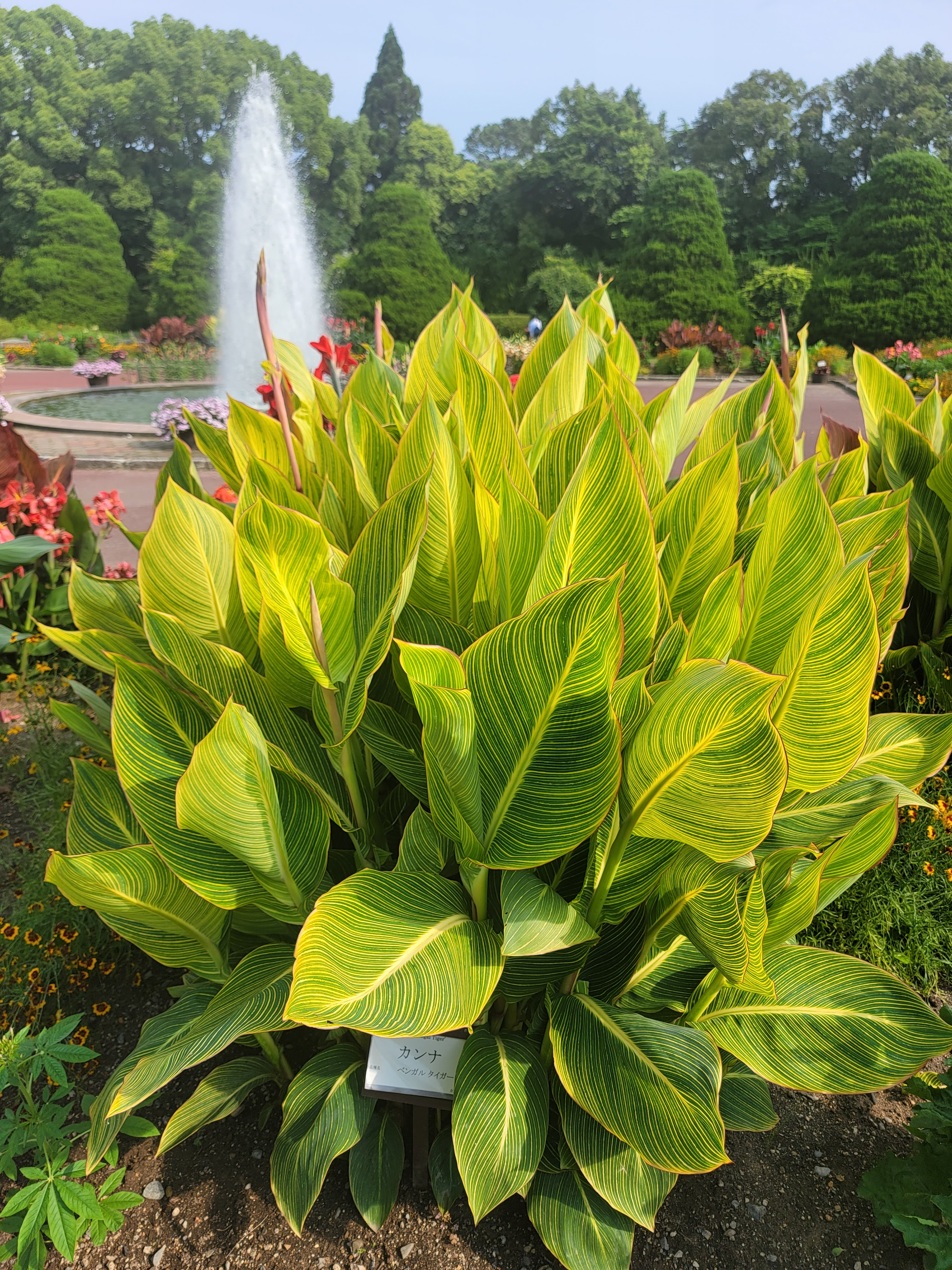
Canna 'Bengal Tiger', Kyoto Botanical Garden

=== Summer gardens - temperatures are moderate to hot ===
Plants used for summer bedding are generally annuals or tender perennials. They are available in retail greenhouses, farmers' markets, nurseries, garden centres and hardware stores during spring and continuing into summer. Experienced gardeners keep an eye on the weather forecasts at that time of year and are on standby to protect their gardens overnight with horticultural fleece (or a sheet or blanket) if frost threatens. Tender annual or perennial plants treated as half-hardy annuals, purchased as young plants, and hardened-off outdoors when all danger of frost has passed (begonia, lobelia, petunia, vinca, zinnia, dahlia, gerbera, argyranthemum, chrysanthemum, pelargonium, nicotiana, cosmos, fuchsia, etc.). Corms, rhizomes, bulbs and tubers of summer flowering plants, such as gladiolus, dahlia, canna, etc., are planted each year and lifted after the plant has died down and stored in winter, or discarded.

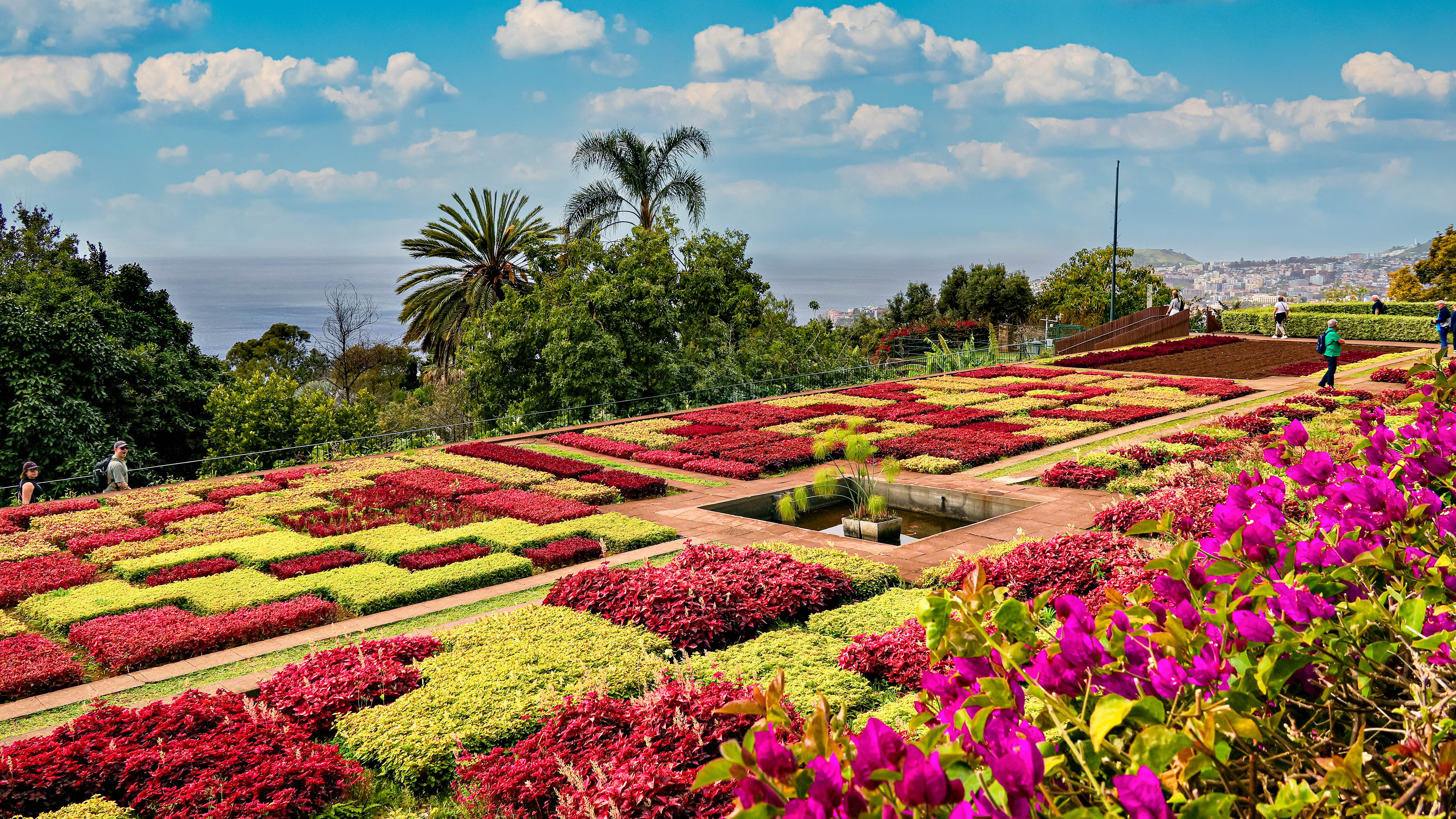
Jardim Botanico, Funchal, Portugal

==== Carpet bedding ====
Carpet bedding employs two or more contrasting plant cultivars with a neat, dwarf habit and distinct colouring (of flower or foliage) to create geometric displays. It is often used to form such things as lettering, logos or trademarks, coats of arms, or floral clocks. Suitable plants are rosette-forming succulents such as Echeveria or fairly slow-growing or mat-forming foliage plants, such as colored-leaved Alternanthera cultivars, which are tolerant of clipping; such plants may also be used in three-dimensional sculptural forms or pseudo-topiary.

William Morris was an early critic, writing in 1882 that it was: "an aberration of the human mind ... when I think of it even when I am quite alone I blush with shame at the thought".

Larger tender houseplants or foliage plants may also be moved out from hobby greenhouses or indoors and planted out in borders (or left in their pots in sheltered positions) for the warmer months, then returned to shelter for the winter.

The modern bedding plant industry breeds and produces plants with a neat, dwarf habit, which flower uniformly and reliably. They are bred primarily for use in large-scale bedding schemes where uniformity and predictability is of paramount importance, but this is often achieved by losing the plants' individual character, and has been criticized by such notable plantsmen as the late Christopher Lloyd, who championed an informal style of bedding. This position has not been in vain, in recent years, bedding plant retailers have happily engaged his informal philosophy with the use of "thrillers, fillers and spillers" for container gardens. A number of websites have lists of the plants that can be used to add excitement and diversity to containers of garden flowers.

== Bedding plants ==
Many diverse plants are grown specifically to produce continuous colour throughout the seasons; plants may be discarded after flowering. There are many taxa and thousands of cultivars, so they will be divided into (1) prefer cool temperatures or (2) prefer warm temperatures. Cool temperate climates may only see cool temperature plants or see some warm temperature plants during the warmest weather. Warm temperate to tropical climates may only see warm temperature plants or see some cool temperature plants during the coolest part of the year.

=== Prefer cooler temperatures (0°–20 °C, 32°–75 °F) ===
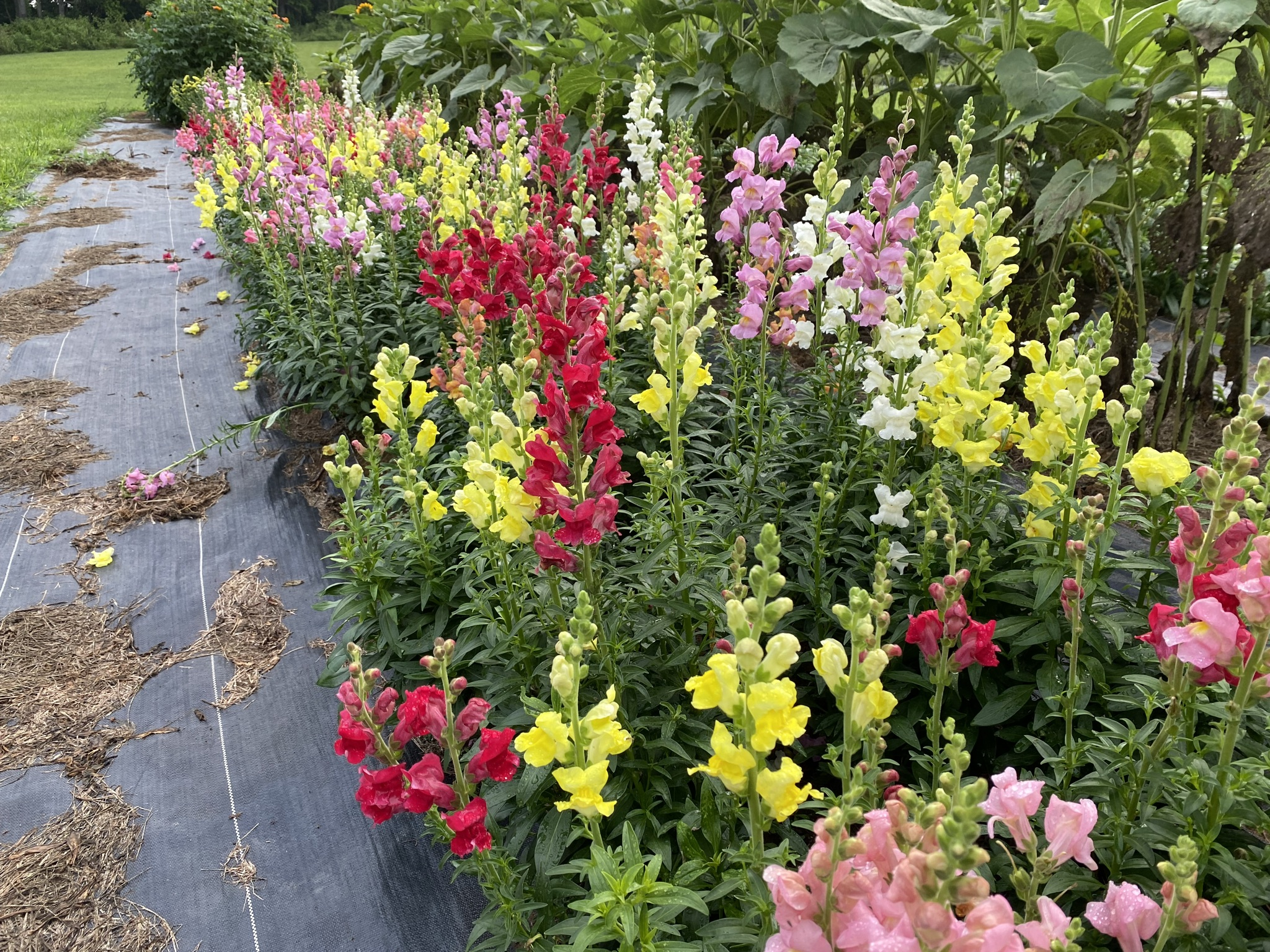
Snapdragon - Antirrhinum majus 'Rocket'

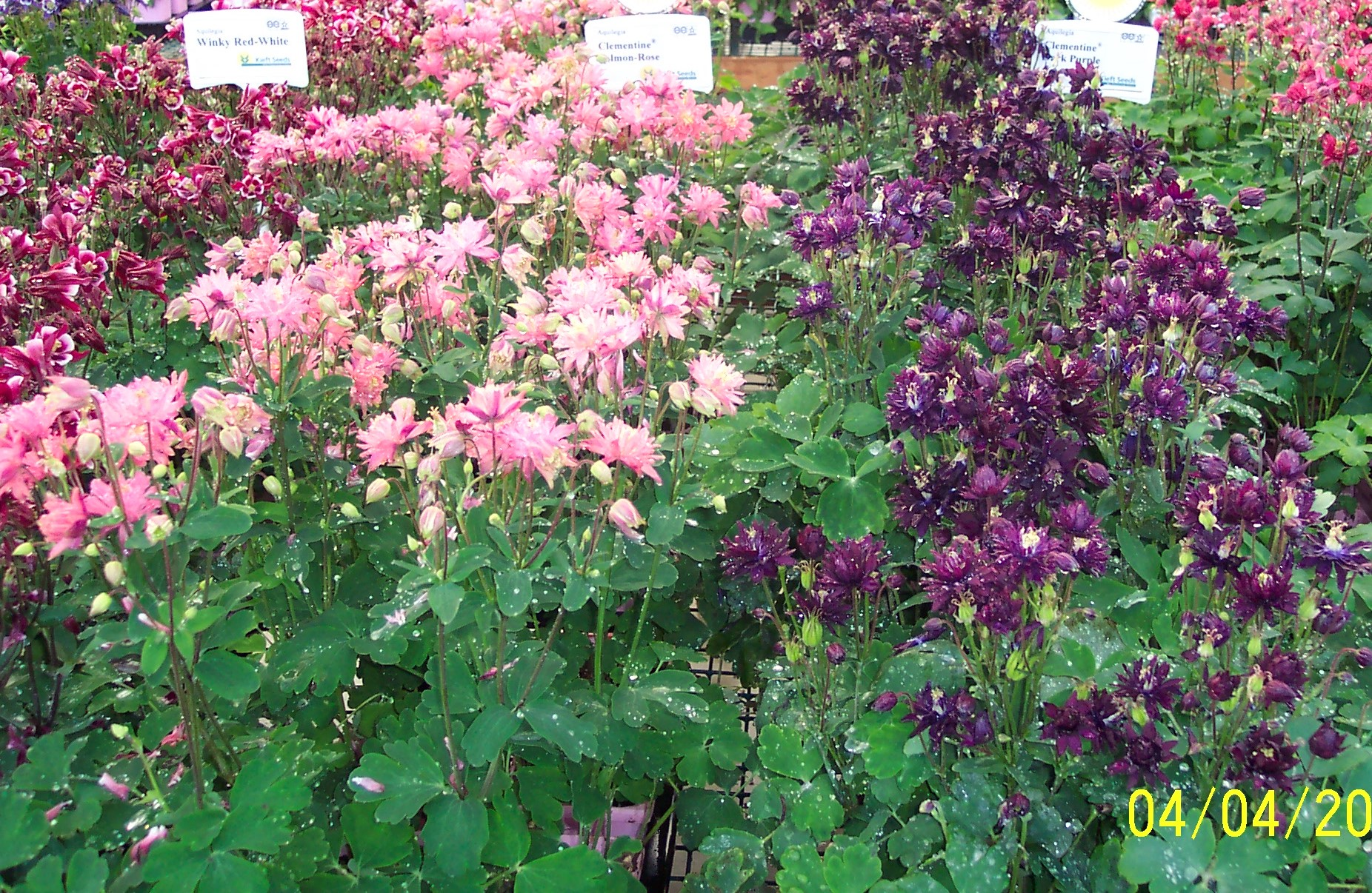
Columbine - Aquilegia 'Clementine'

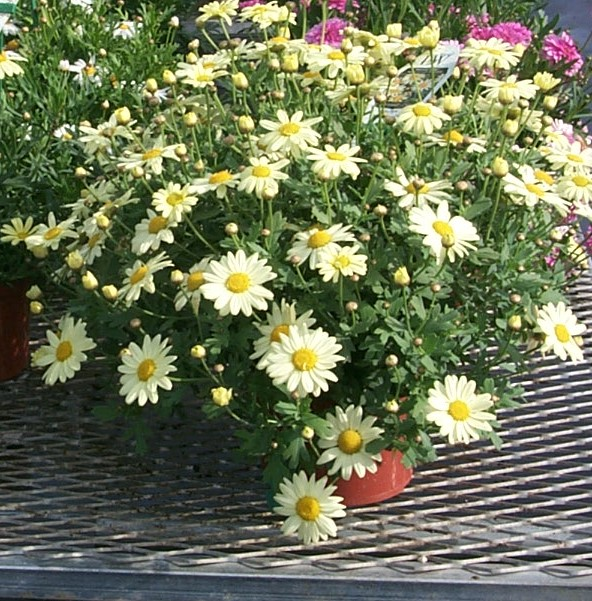
Marguerite Daisy - Argyranthemum frutescens at Proven Winner's trials

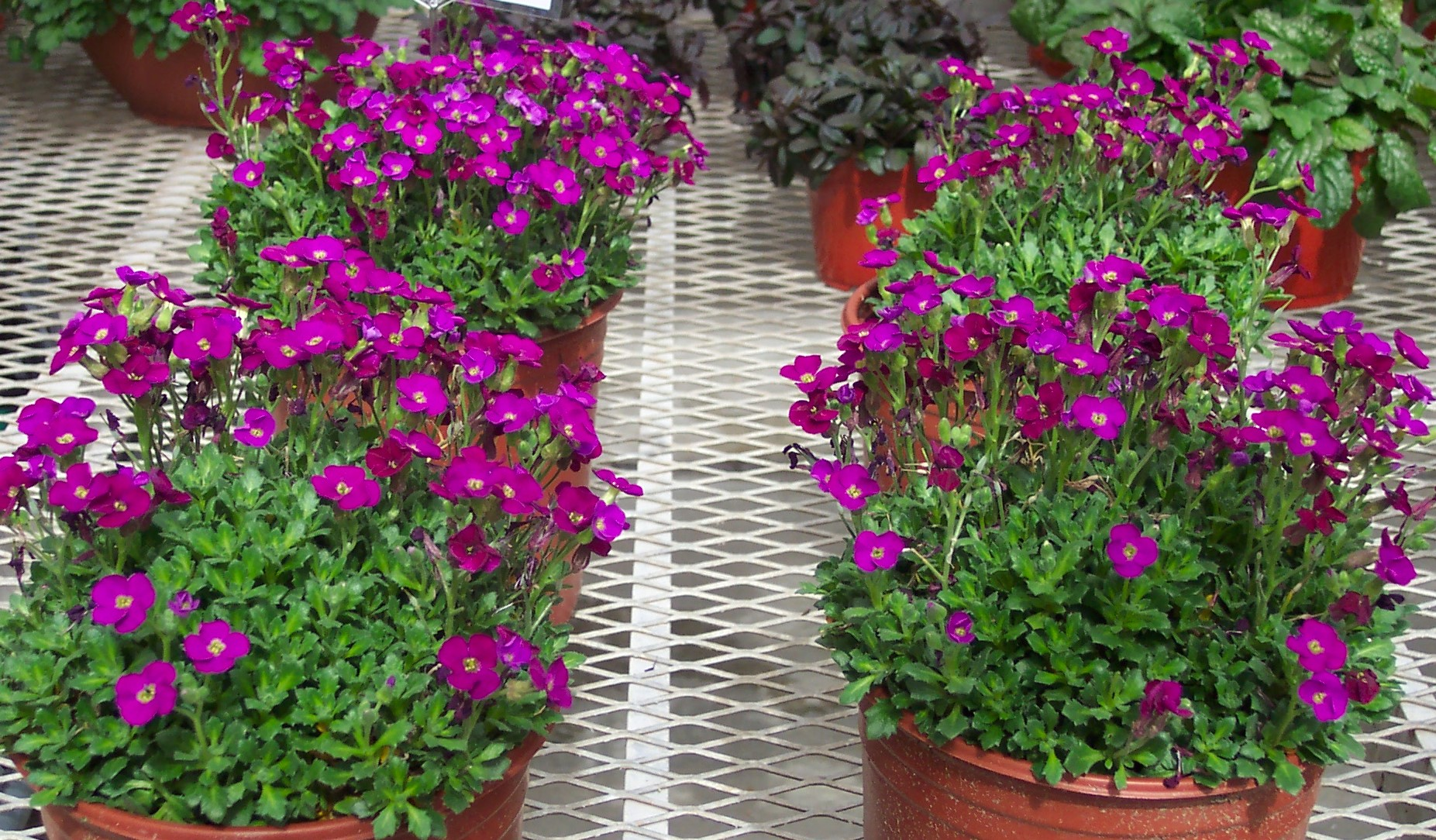
Aubrieta deltoidea 'Gloria'

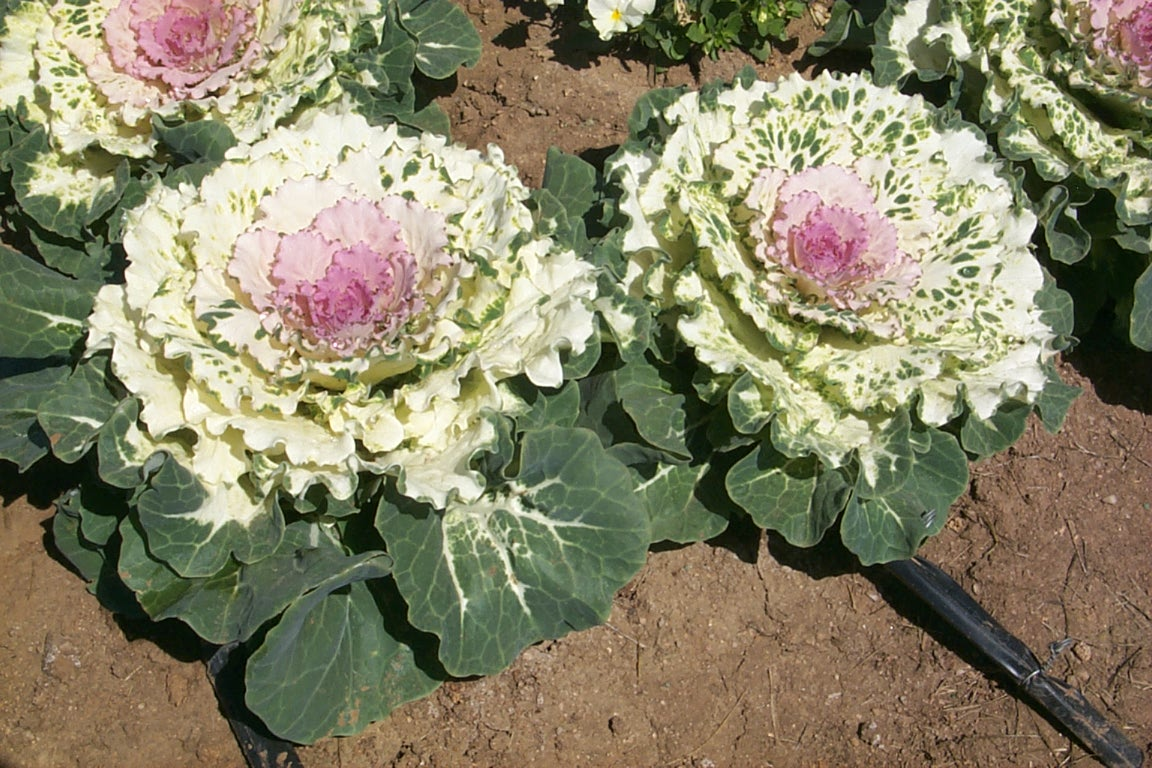
Ornamental cabbage - Brassica oleracea

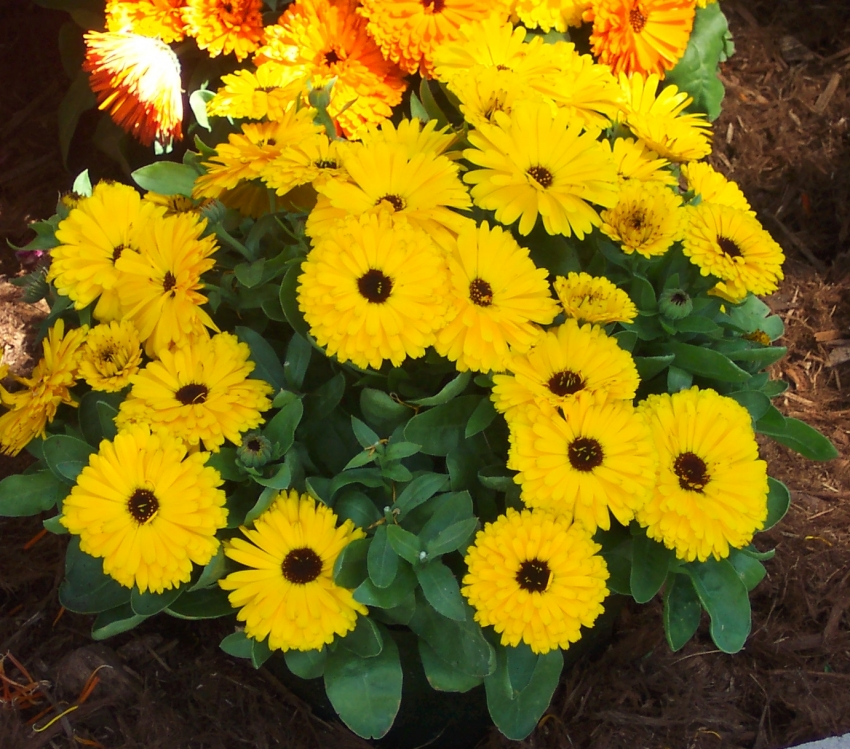
Pot marigold - Calendula officinalis

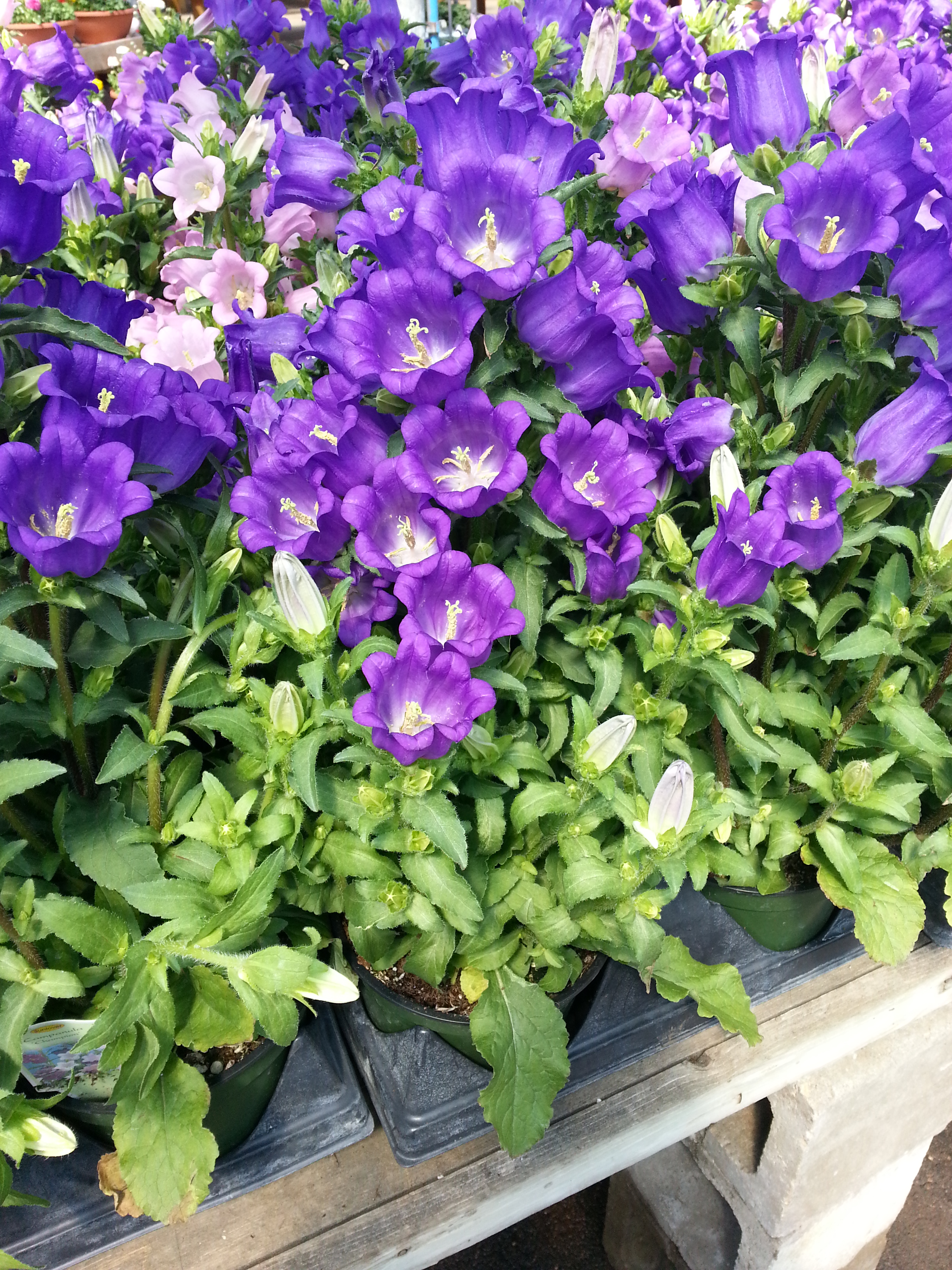
Canterbury bells - Campanula medium

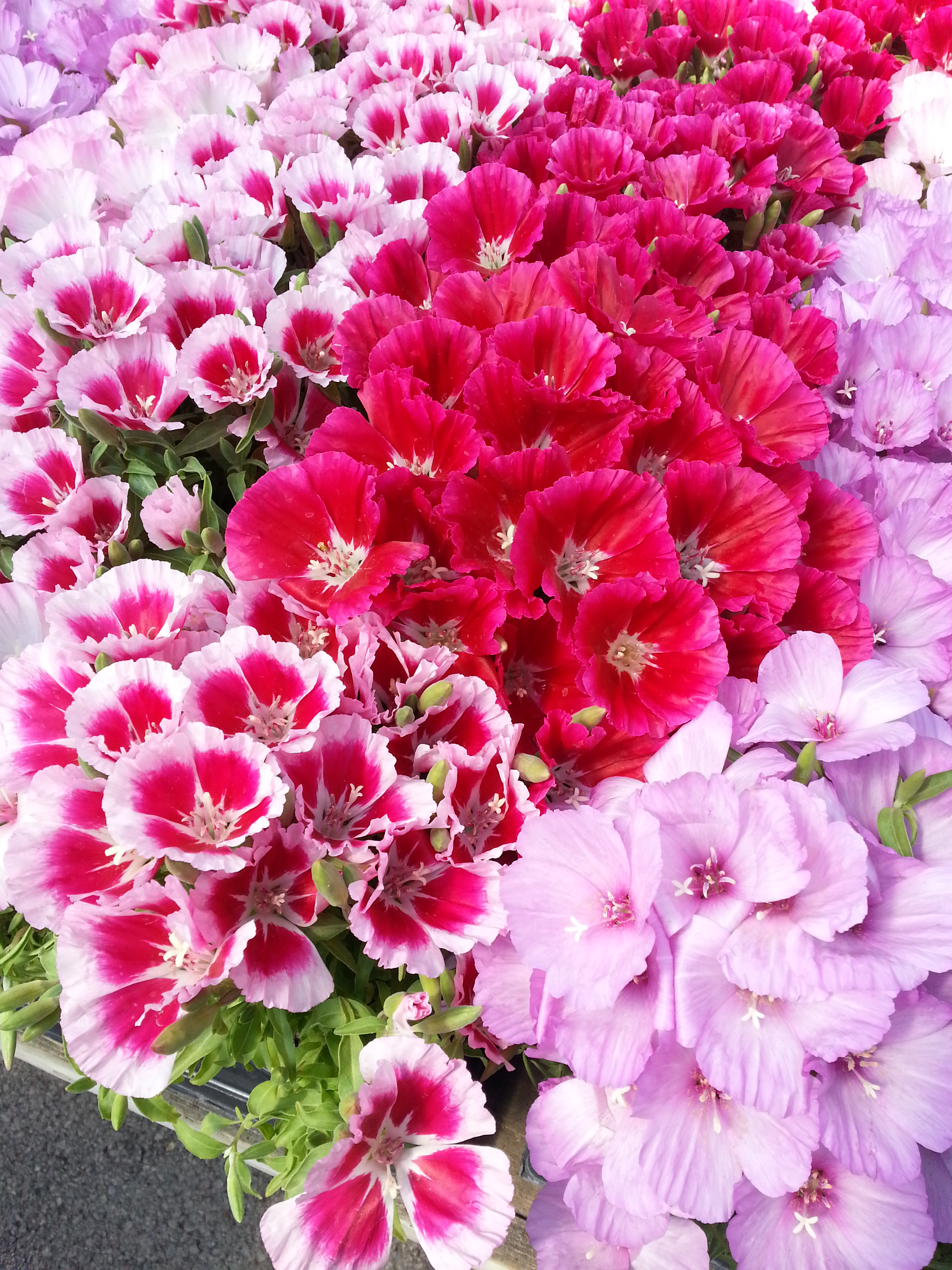
Satin flower, godetia - Clarkia amoena

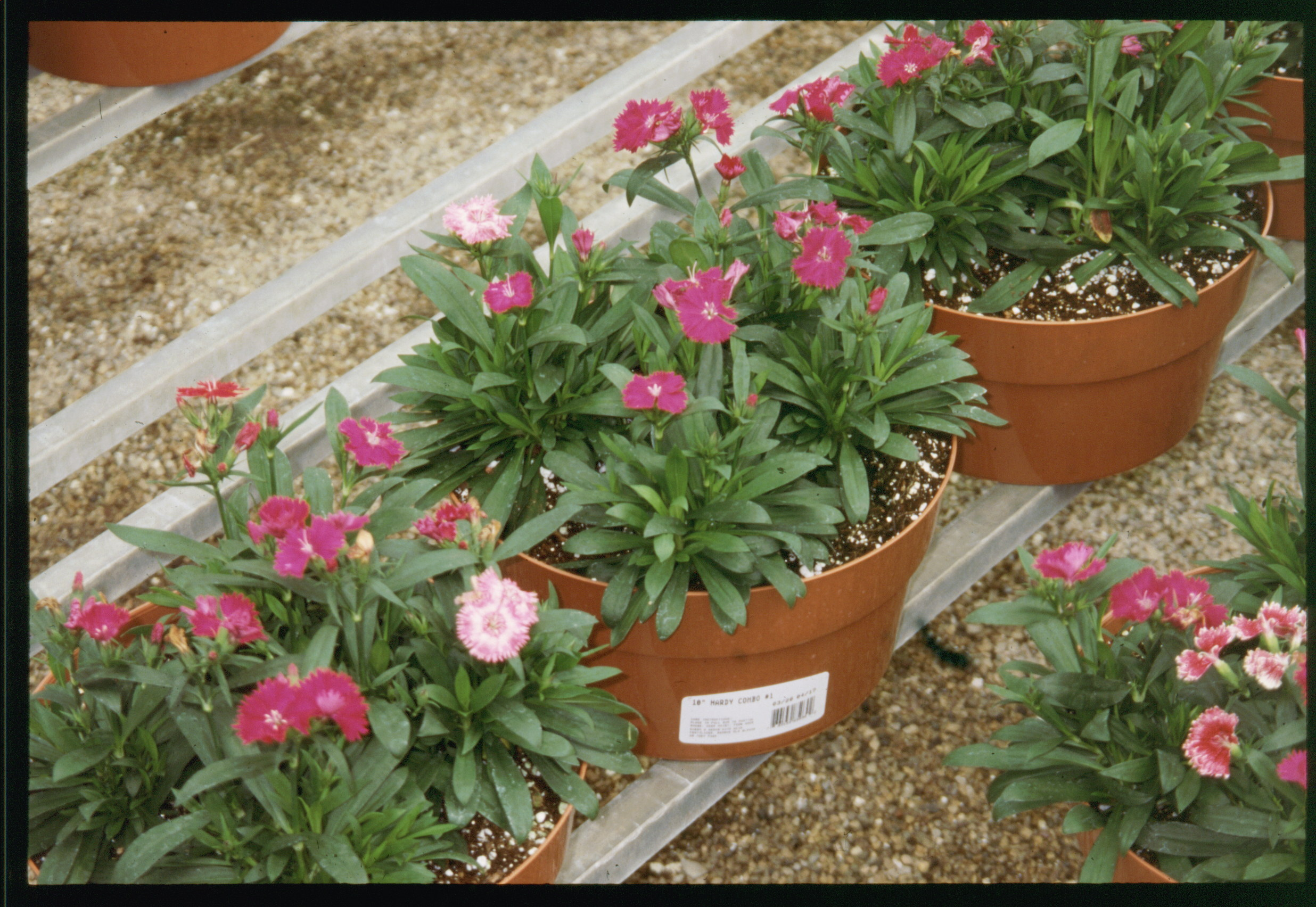
Pinks - Dianthus chinensis in color bowls

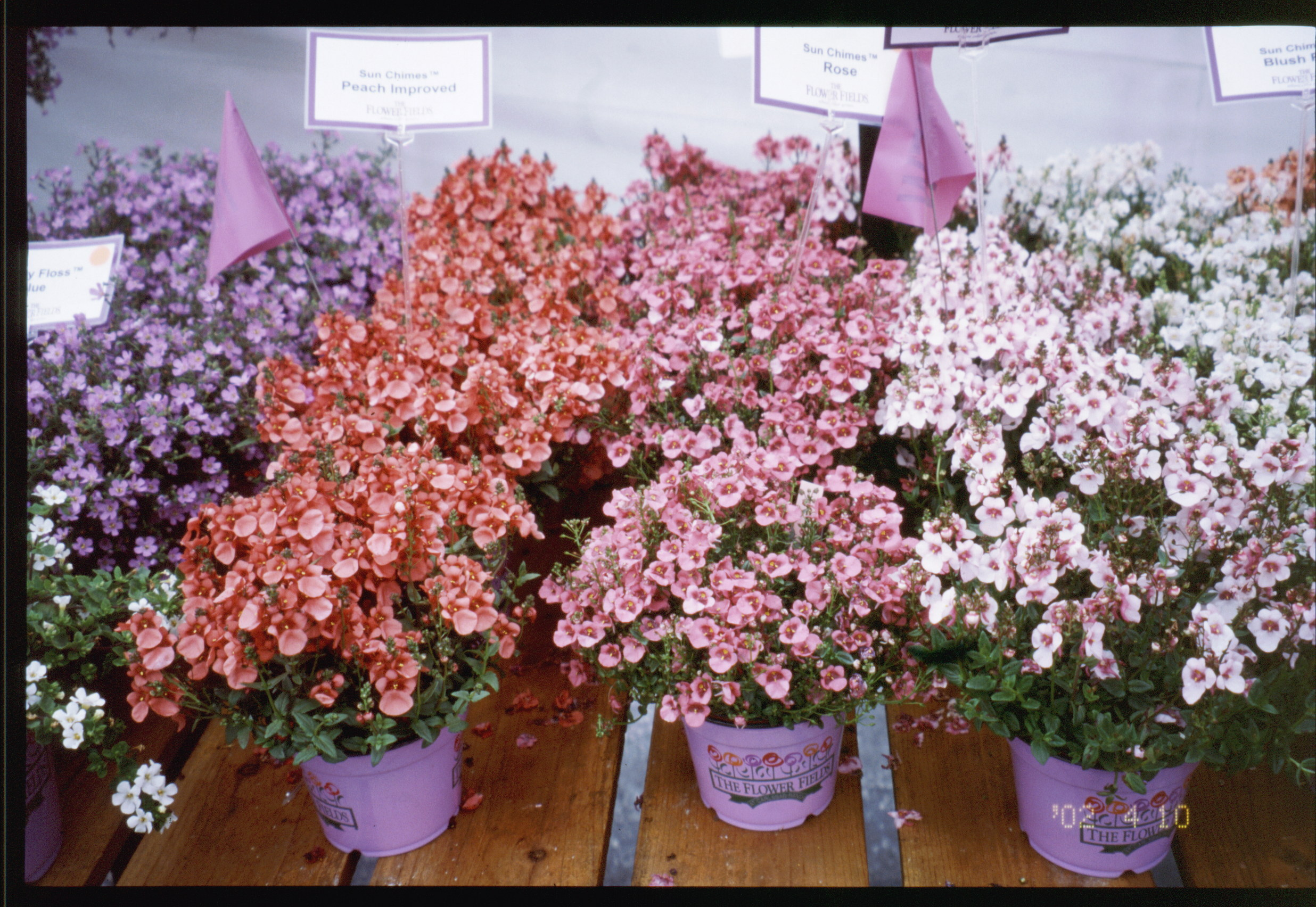
Twinspur - Diascia x hybrida 'Sun Chimes'

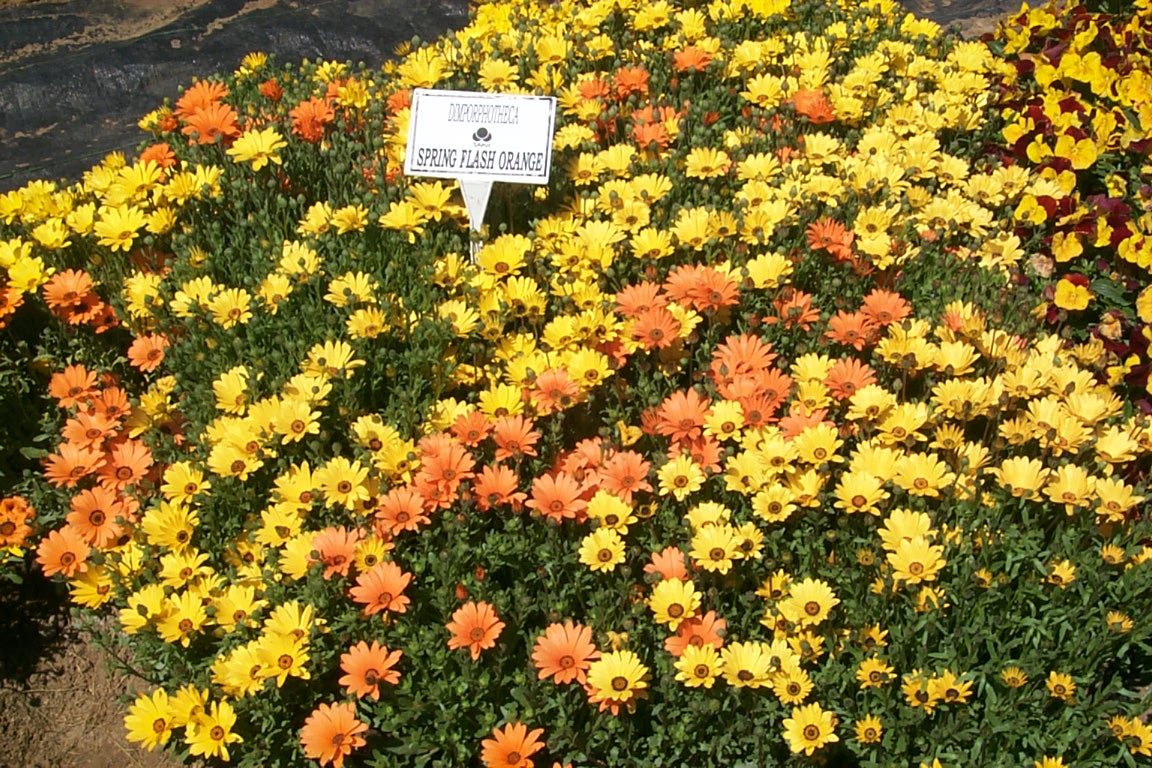
Dimorphotheca pluvialis 'Spring Flash'

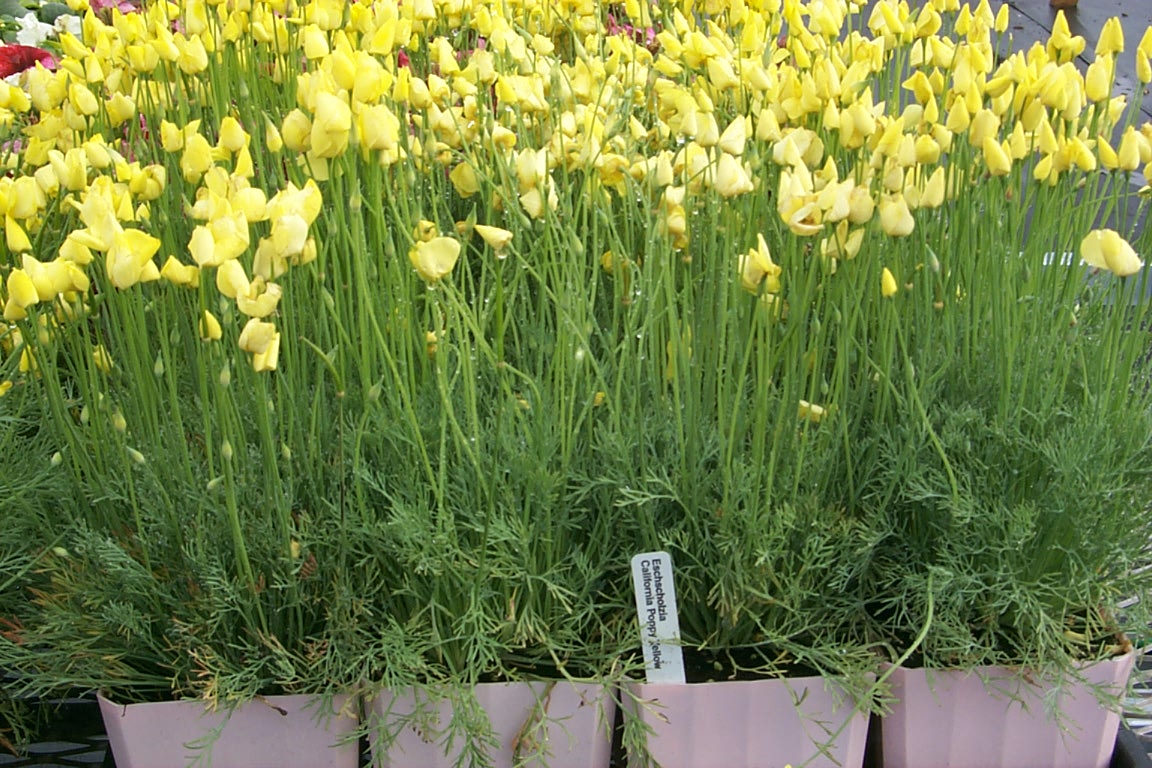
California poppy - Eschscholzia californica

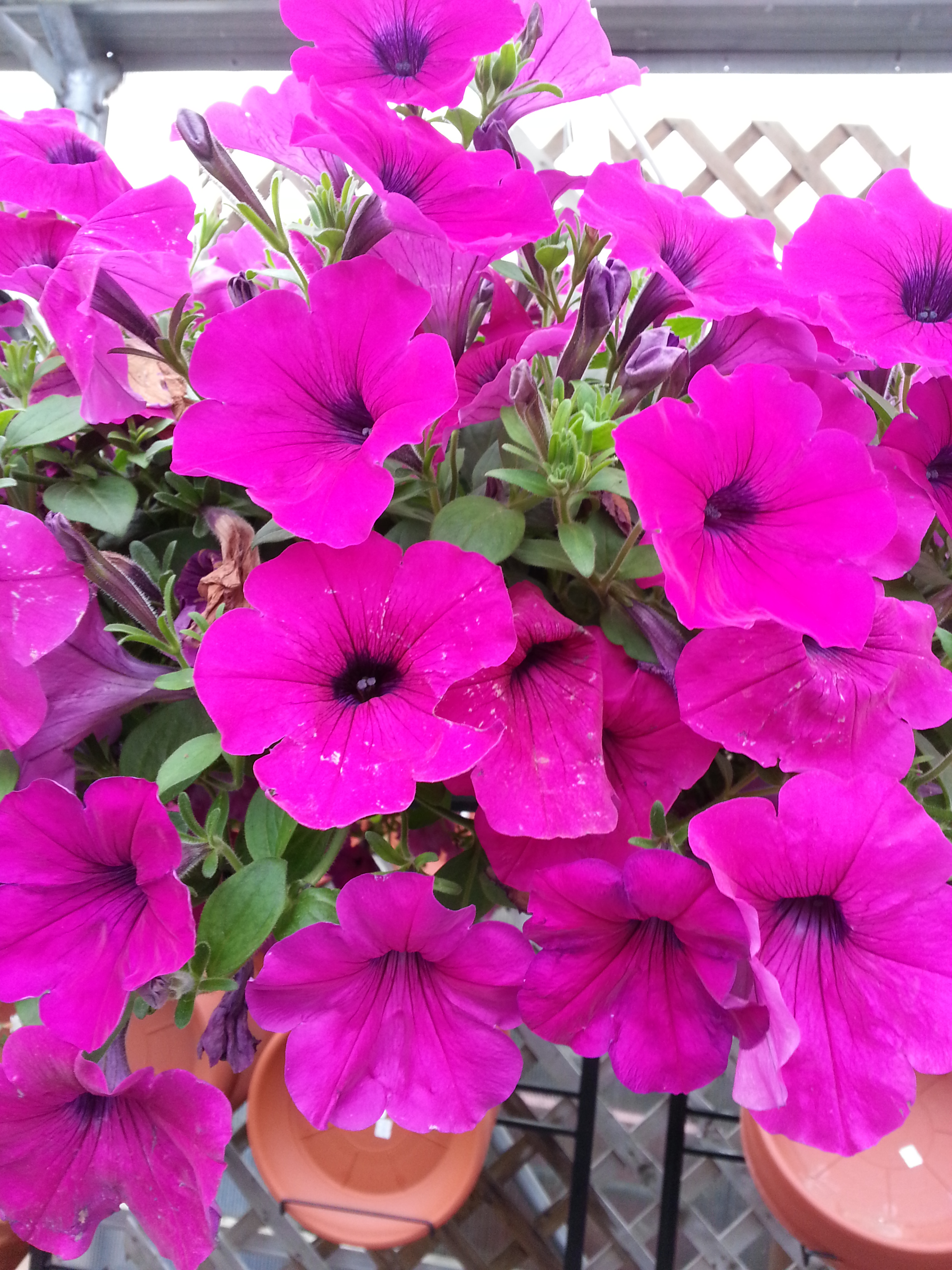
Petunia - Petunia 'Purple Wave'

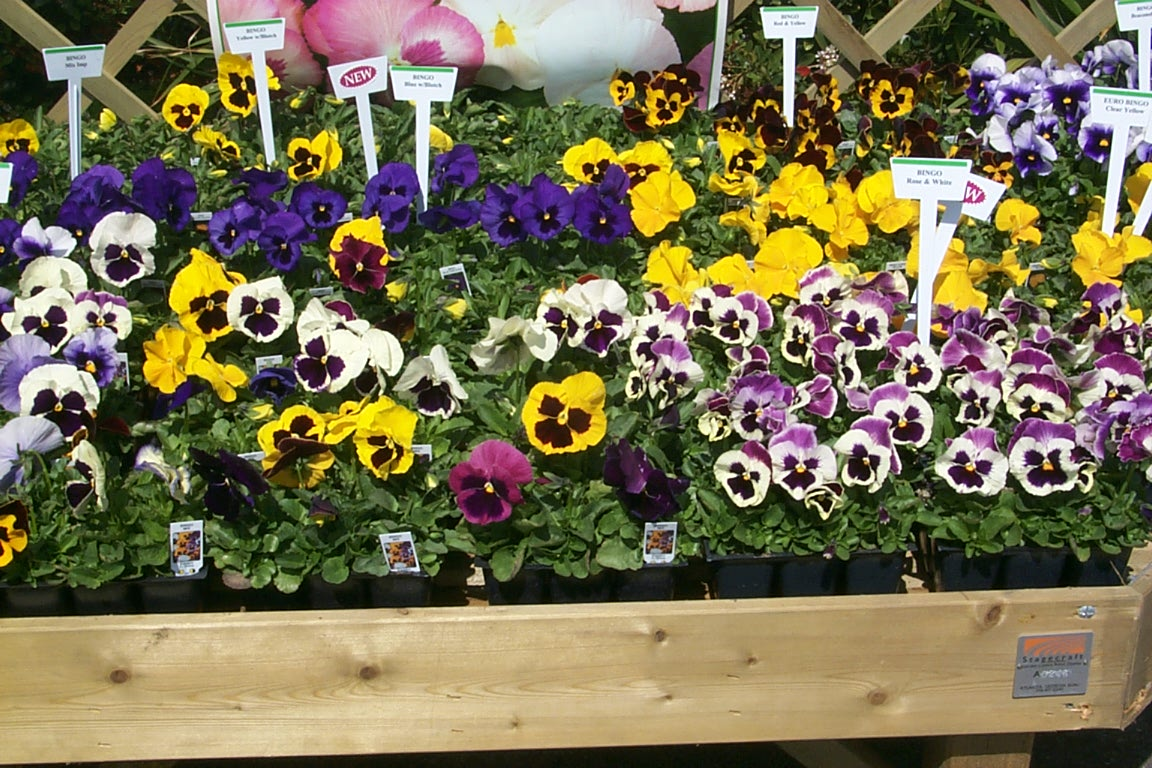
Pansy - Viola x wittrockiana

=== Prefer warmer temperatures (10°–35 °C, 50°–95 °F) ===
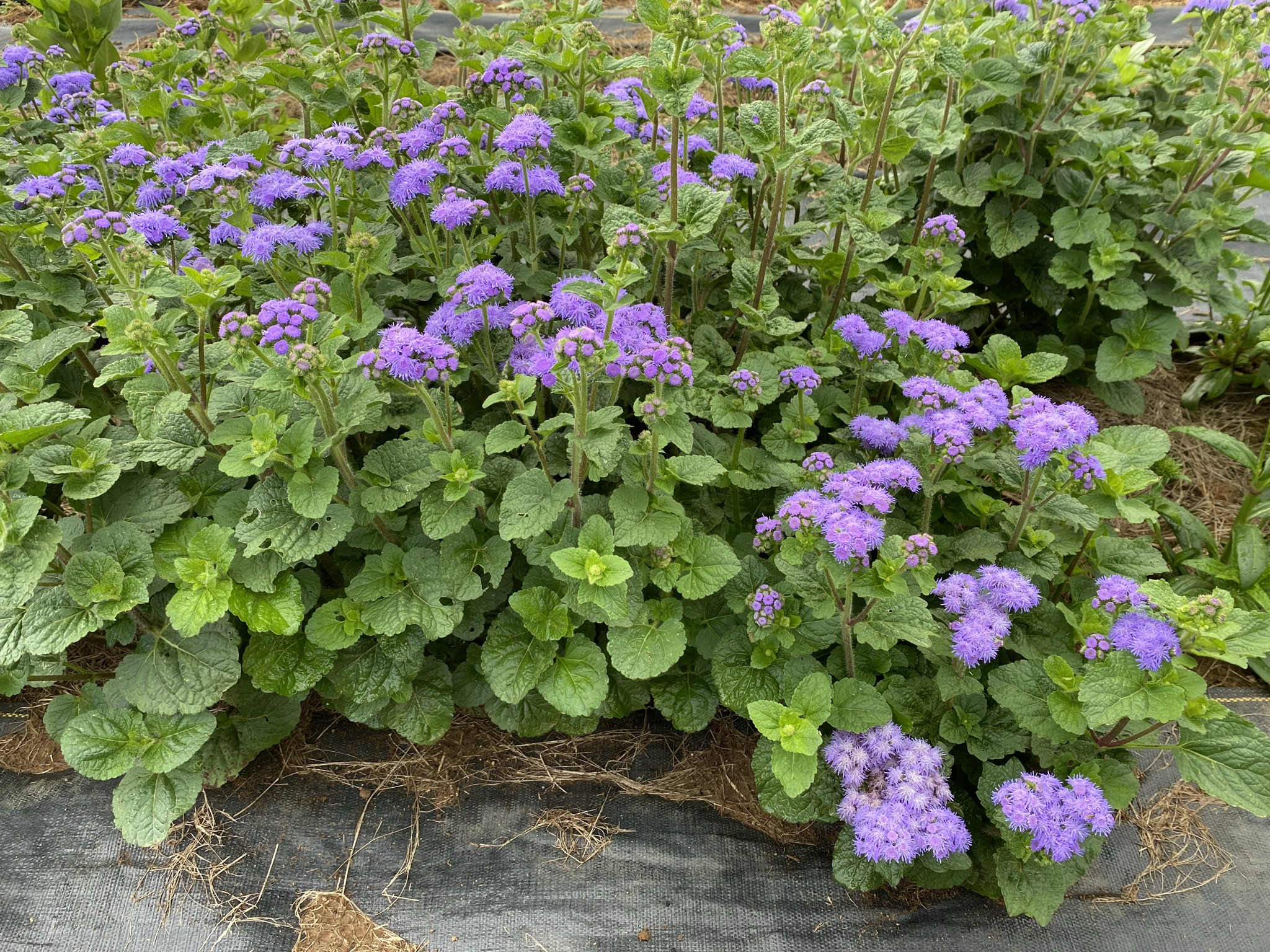
Floss flower - Ageratum houstonianum 'Blue Horizon'

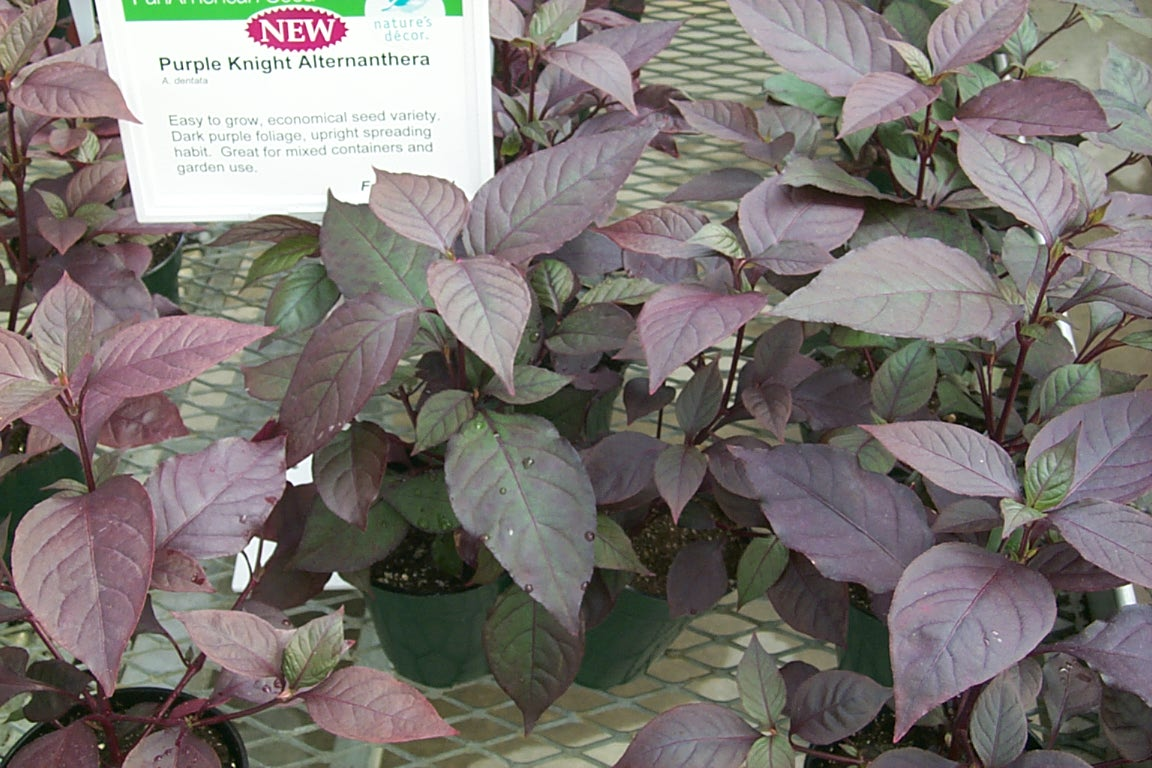
Alternanthera dentata 'Purple Knight'

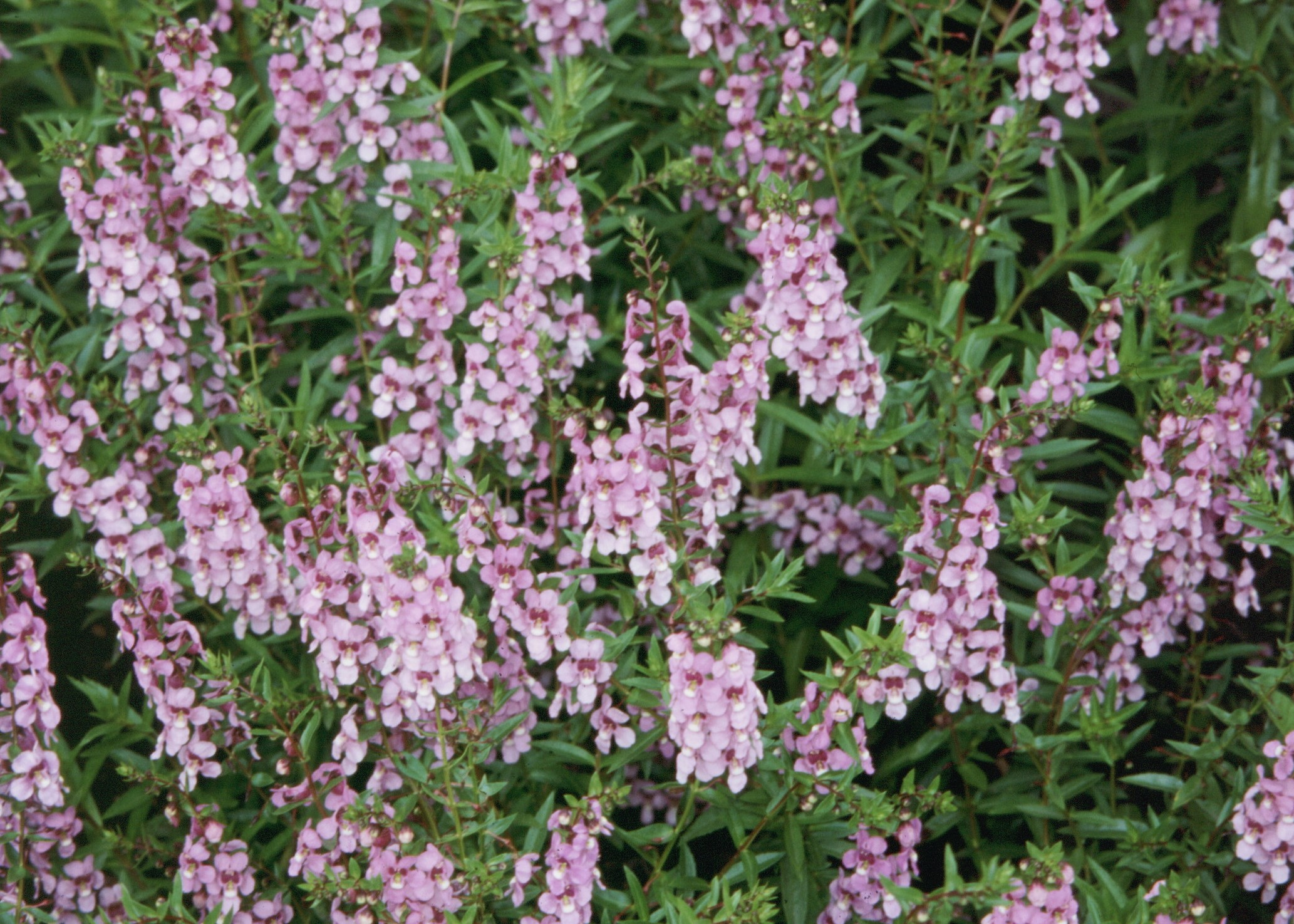
Summer snapdragon - Angelonia angustifolia 'Angel Mist Deep Pink'

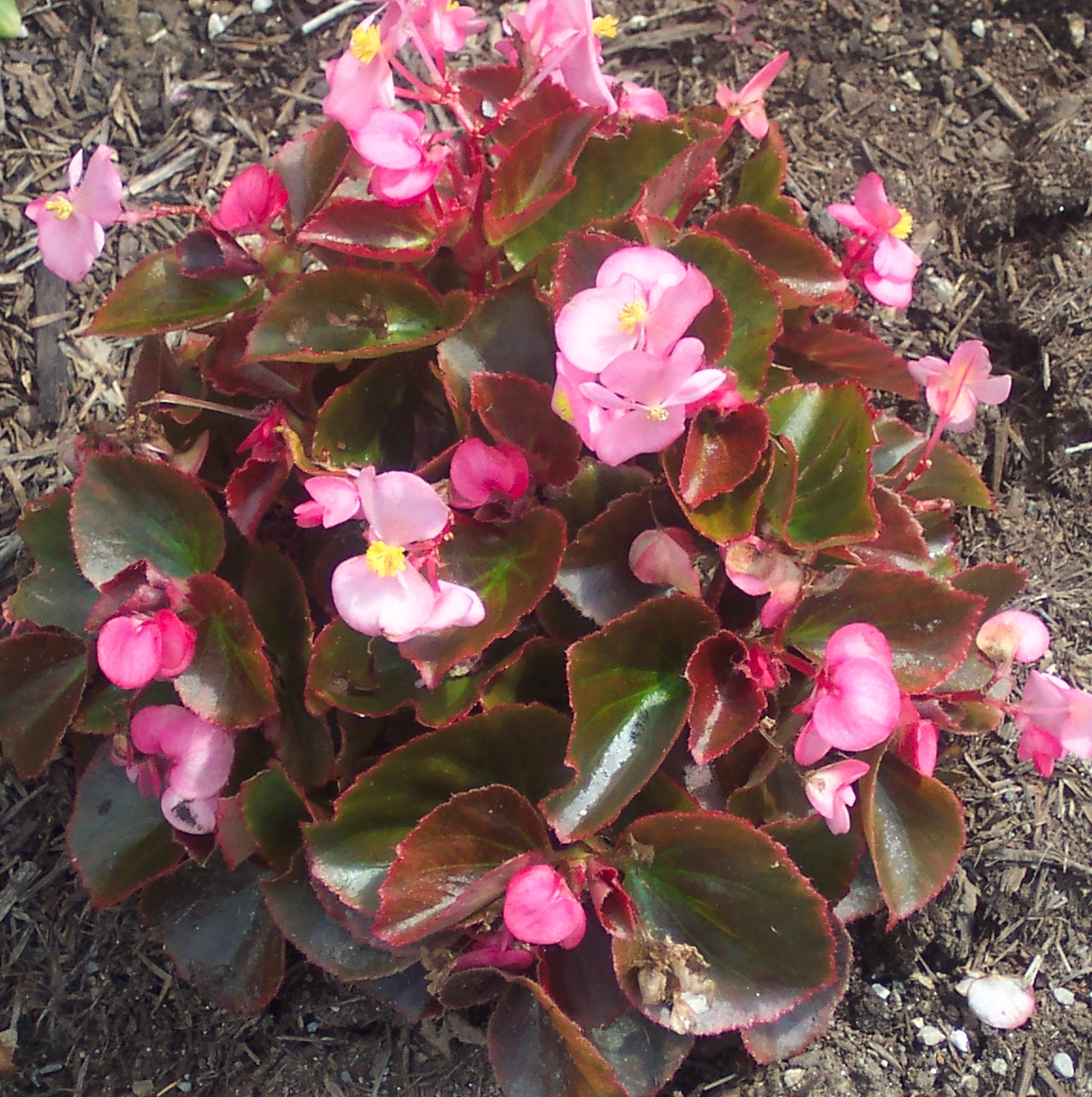
Wax begonia - Begonia 'Gin'

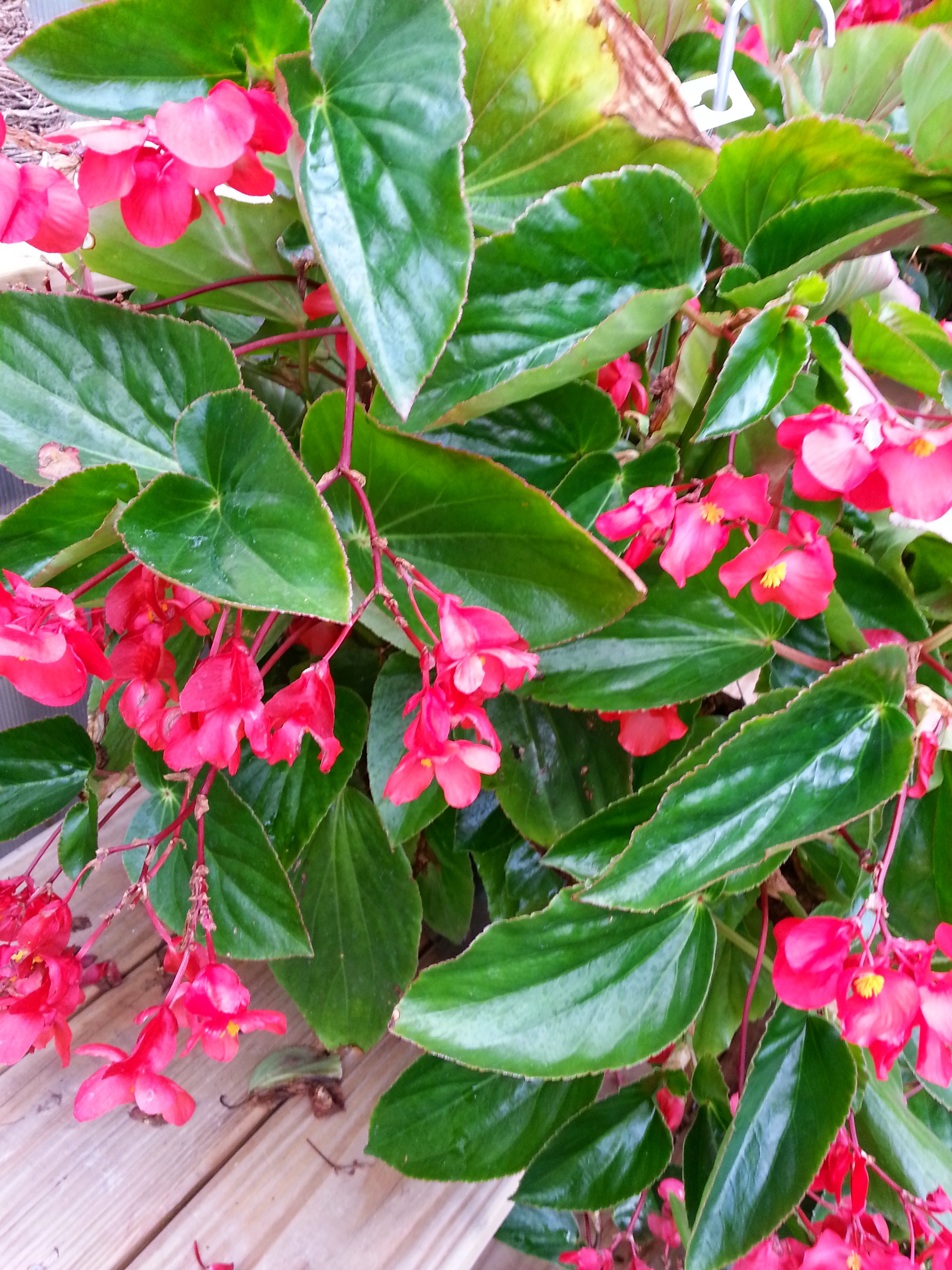
Begonia - Begonia 'Dragon Wing Pink'

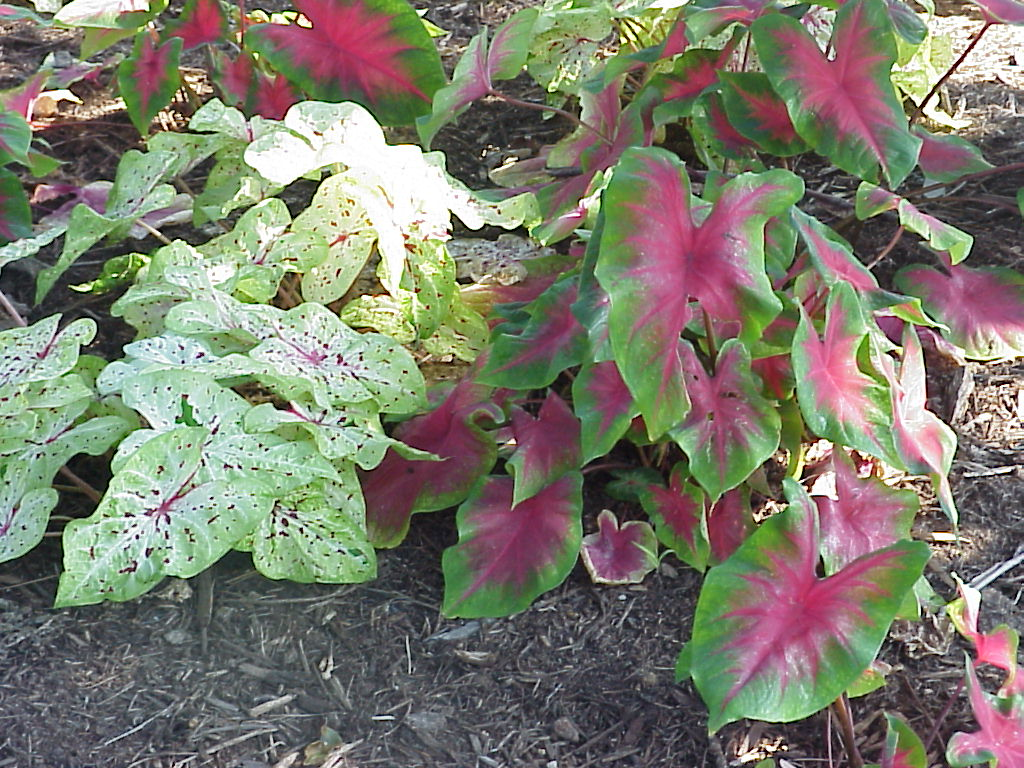
Caladium - Caladium bicolor

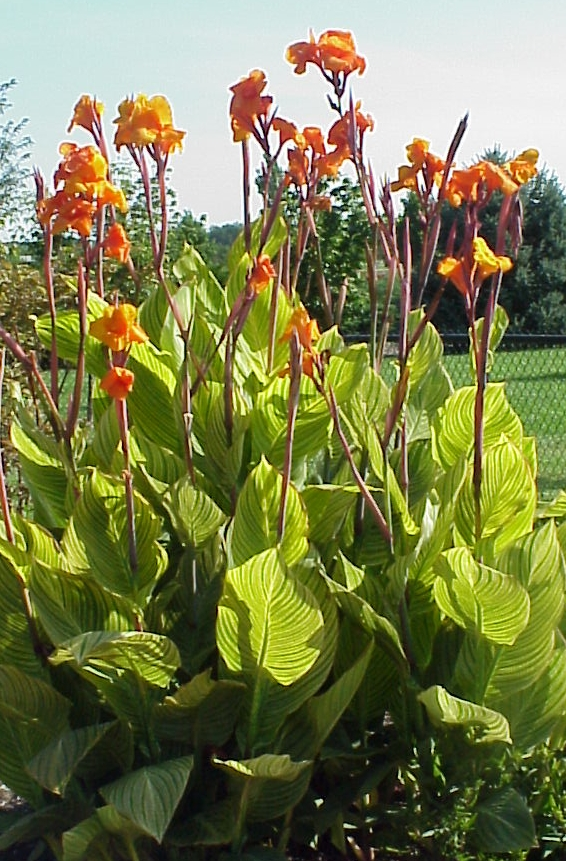
Canna - Canna x generalis 'Bengal Tiger'

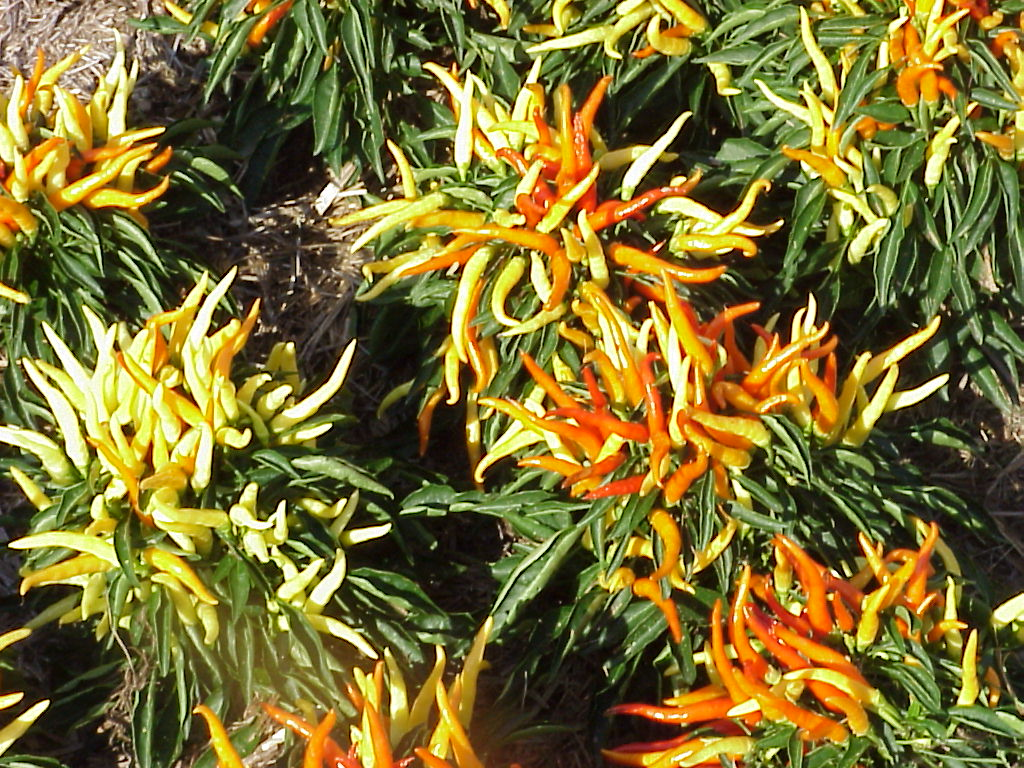
Ornamental pepper - Capsicum annuum 'Medusa'

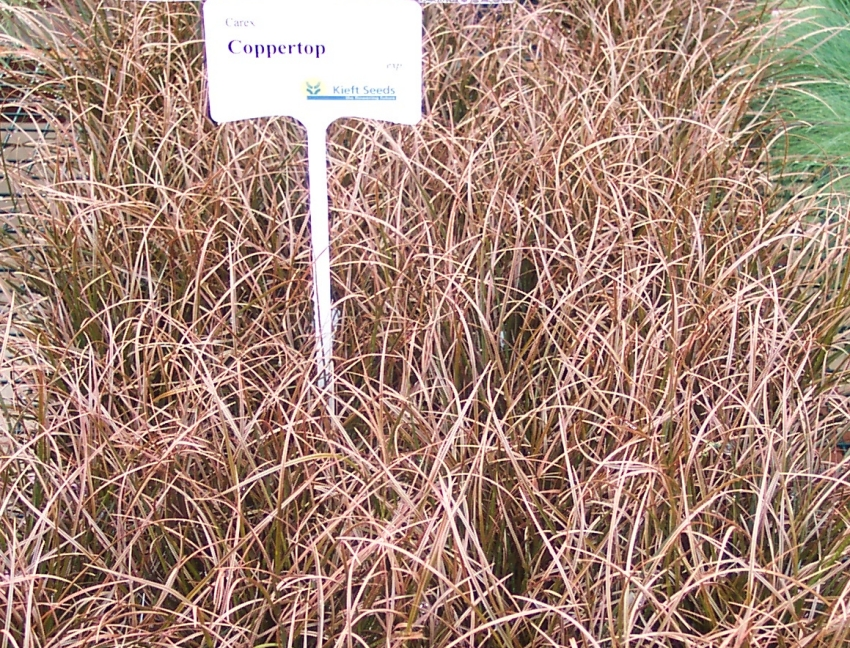
Sedge - Carex 'Coppertop'

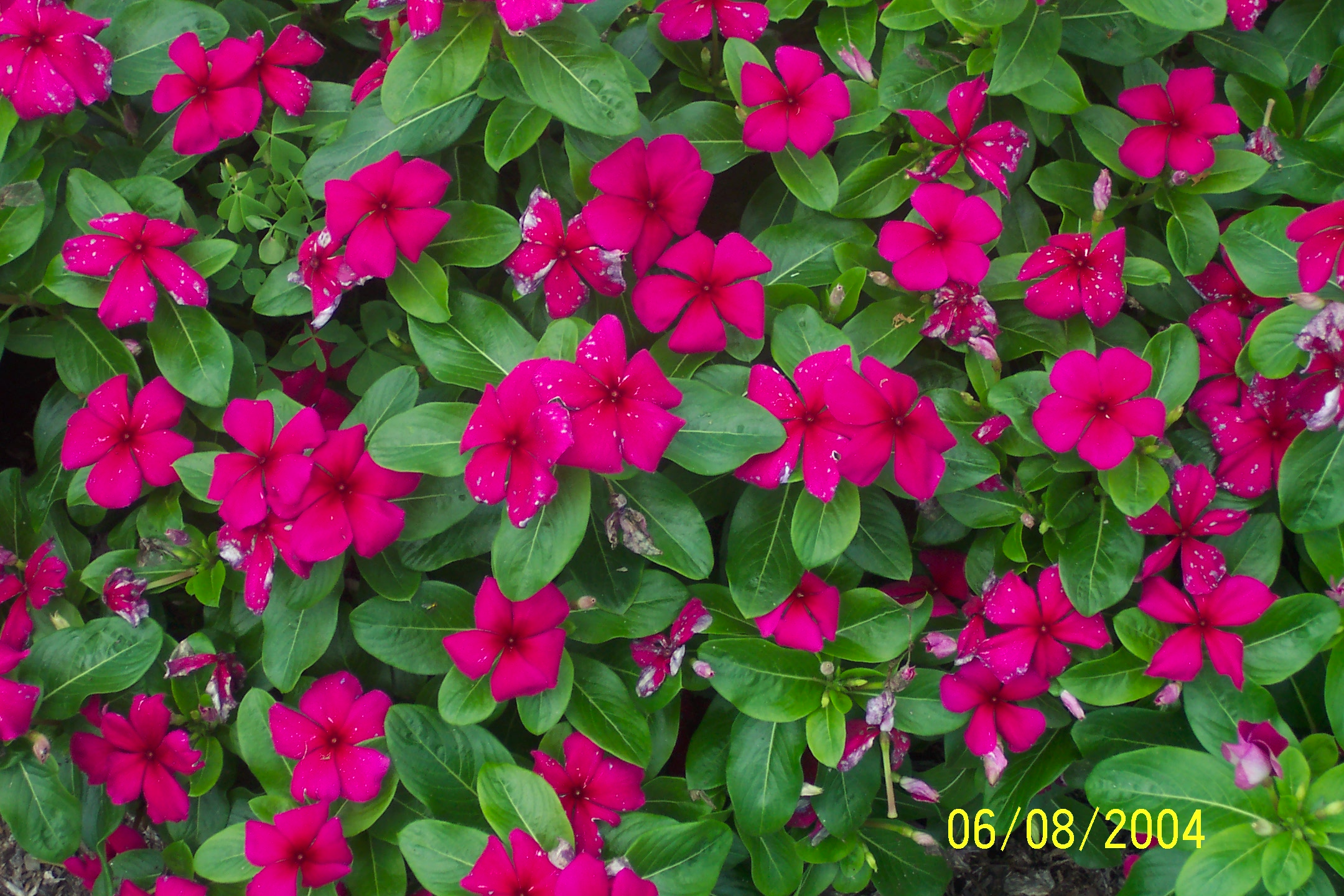
Vinca 'Titan Burgundy - Catharanthus roseus

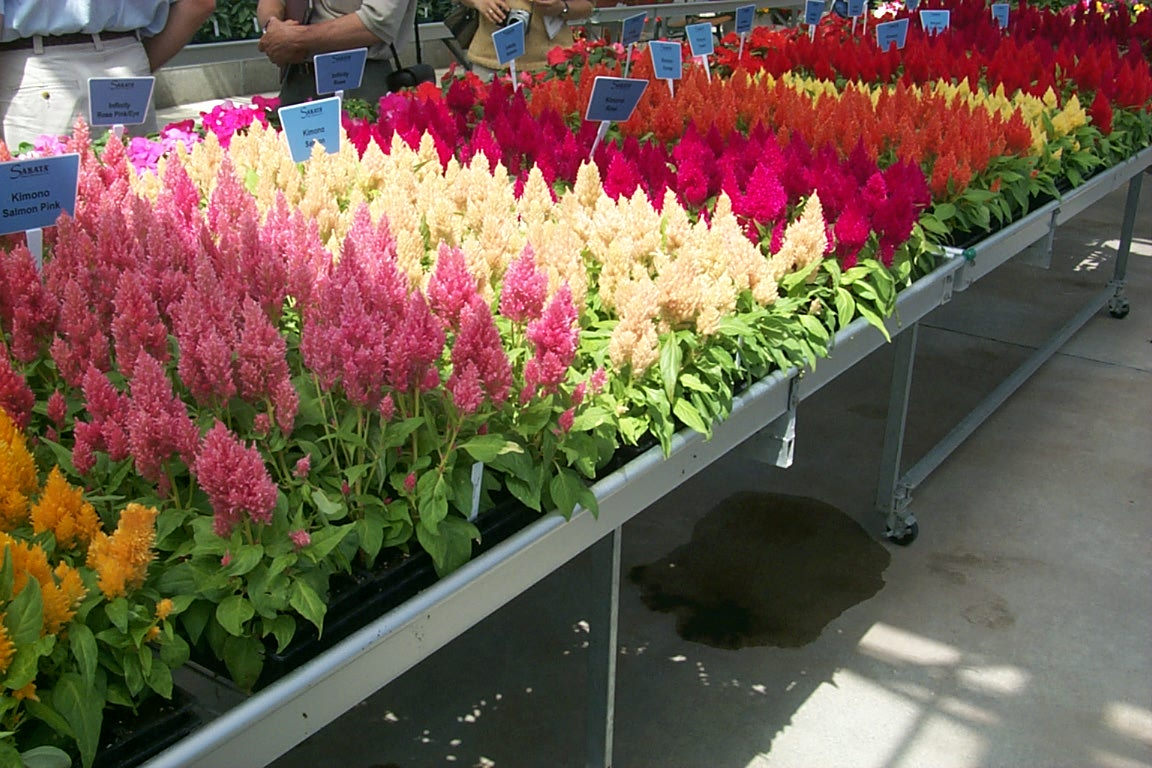
Celosia - Celosia argentea 'Kimono'

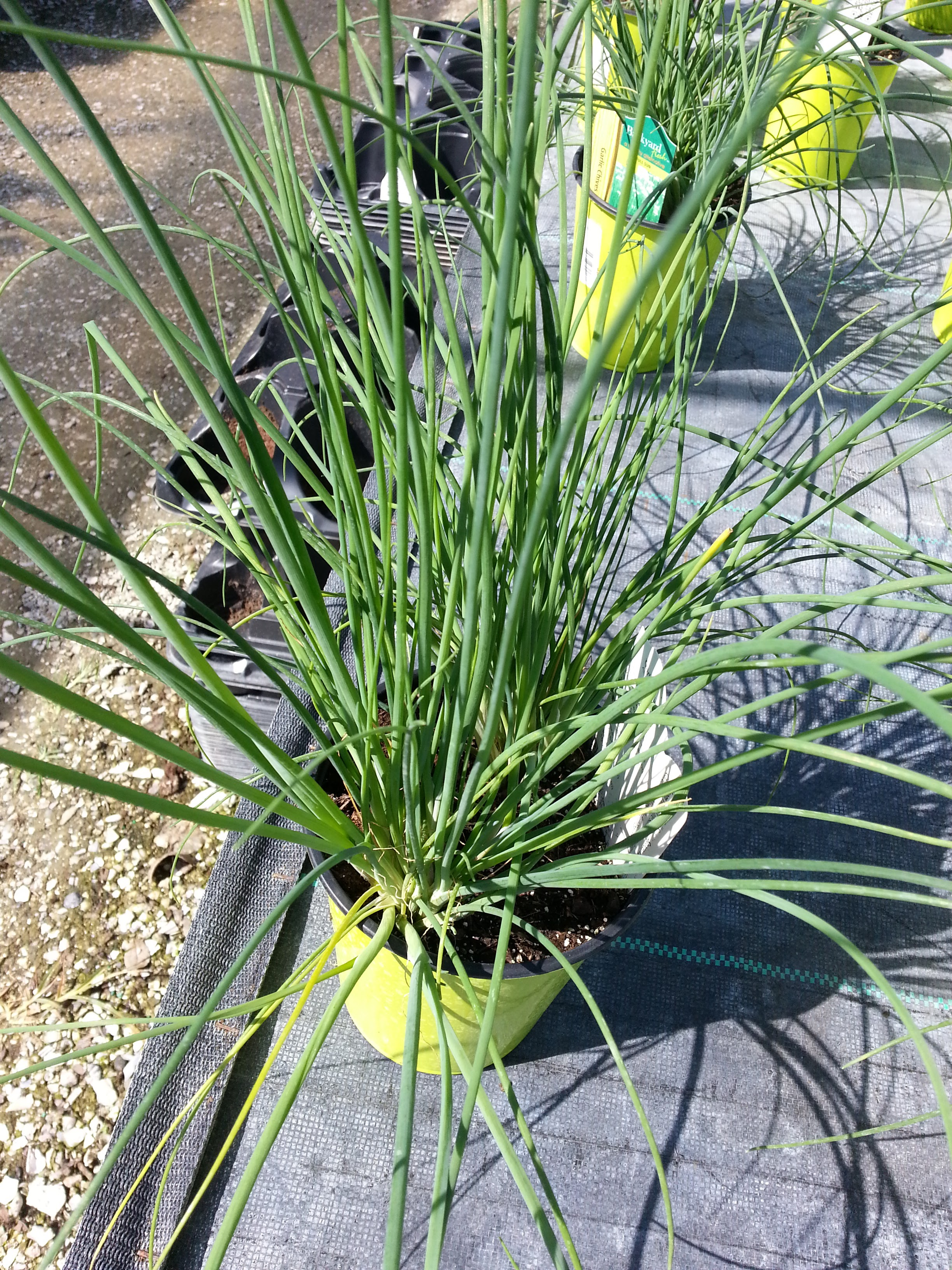
Dracena, spike - Cordyline australis

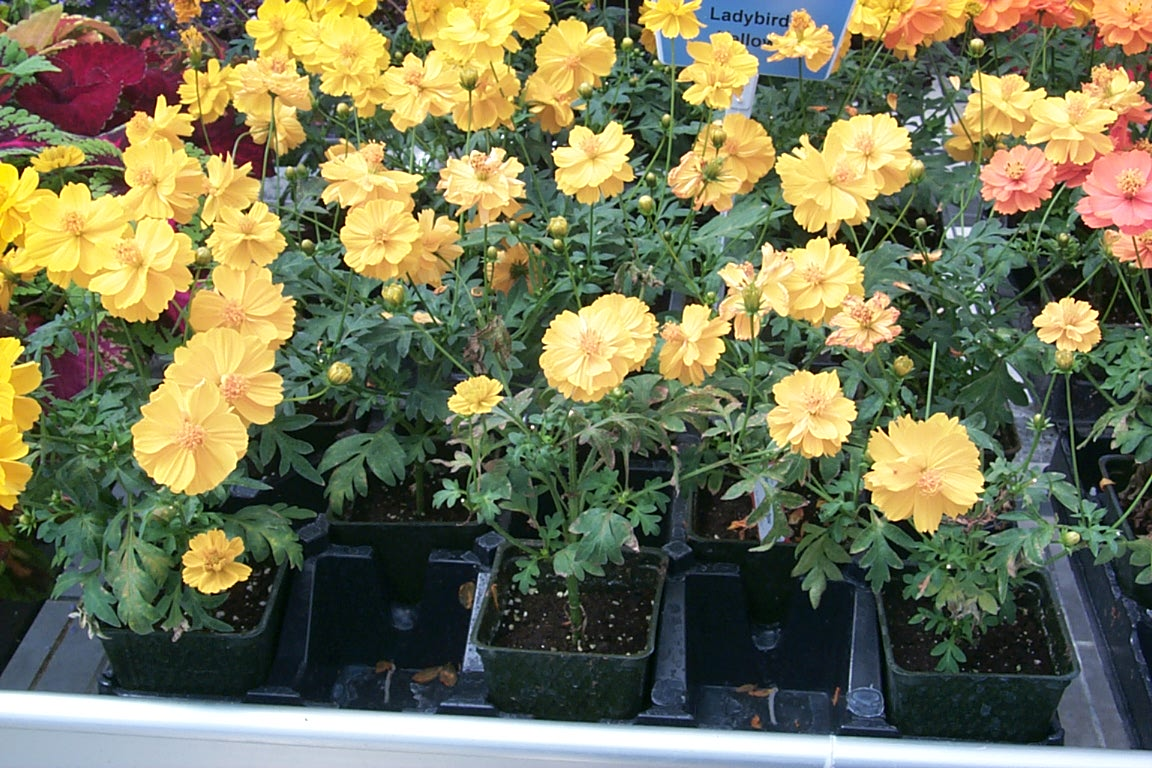
Cosmos - Cosmos sulphureus 'Lady Bird Yellow'

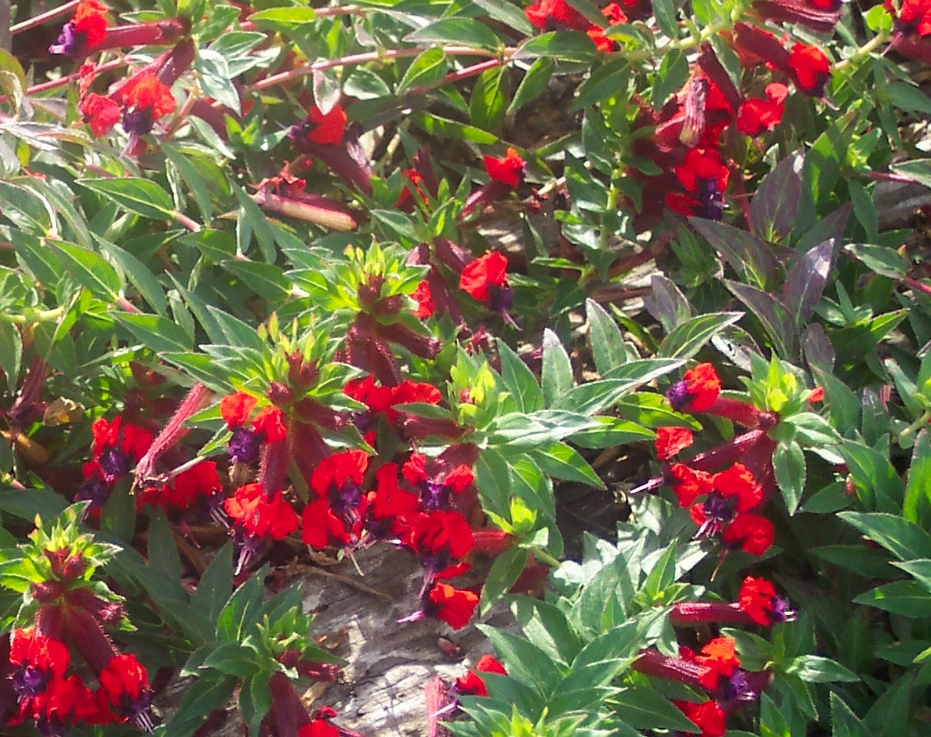
Cuphea llavea 'Tiny Mice'

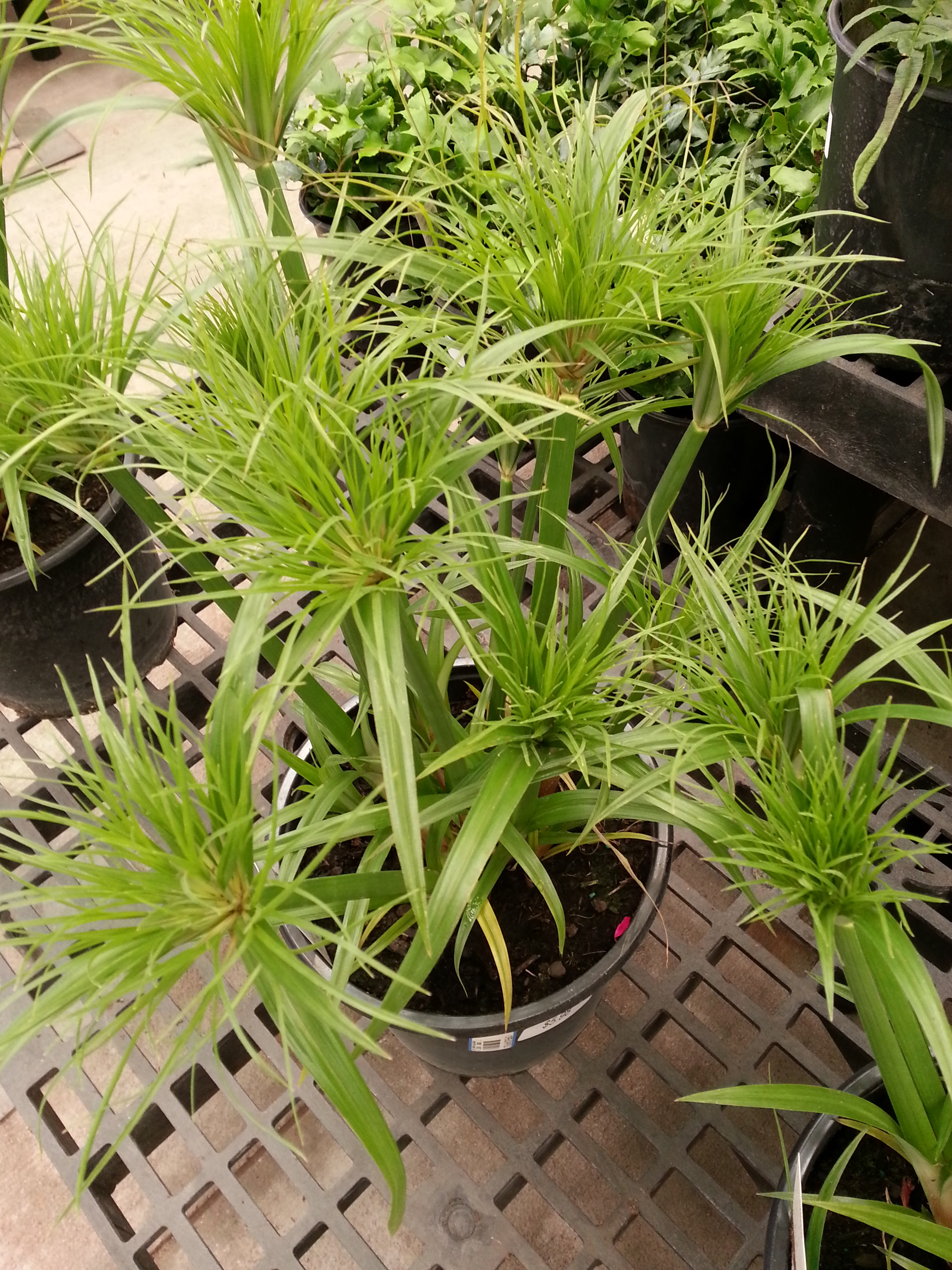
Papyrus - Cyperus papyrus 'Baby Tut'

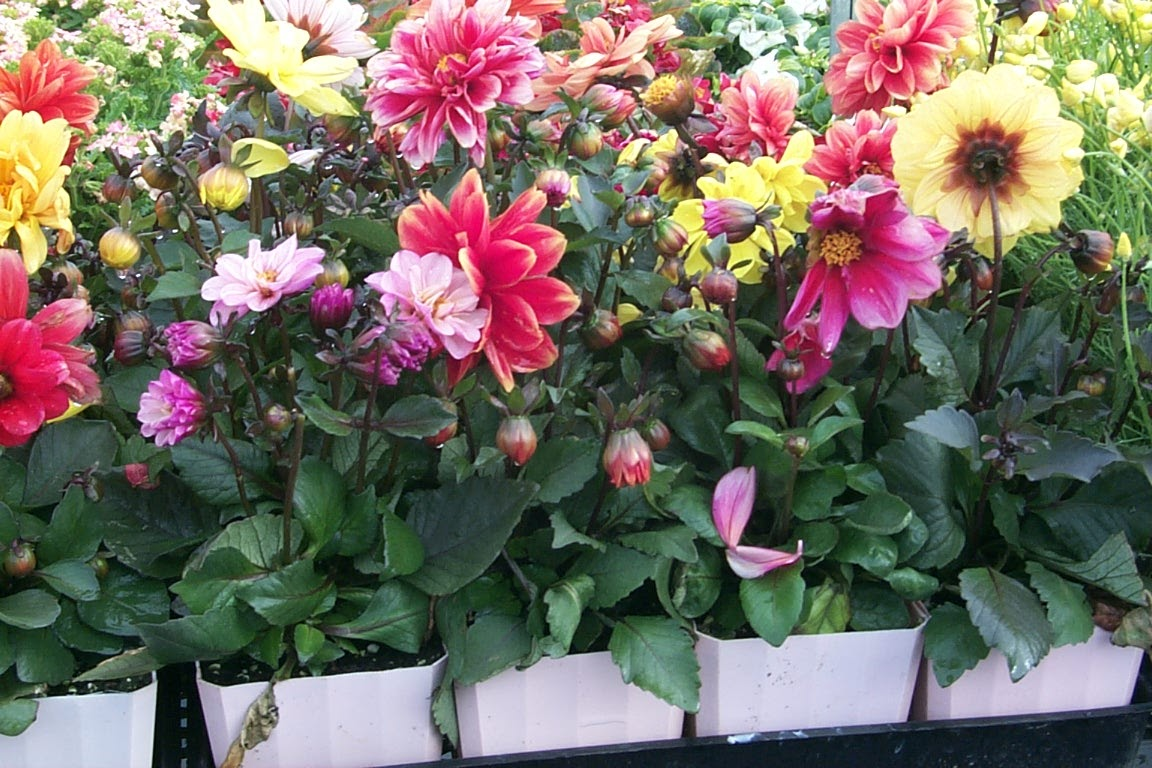
Dahlia - Dahlia pinnata

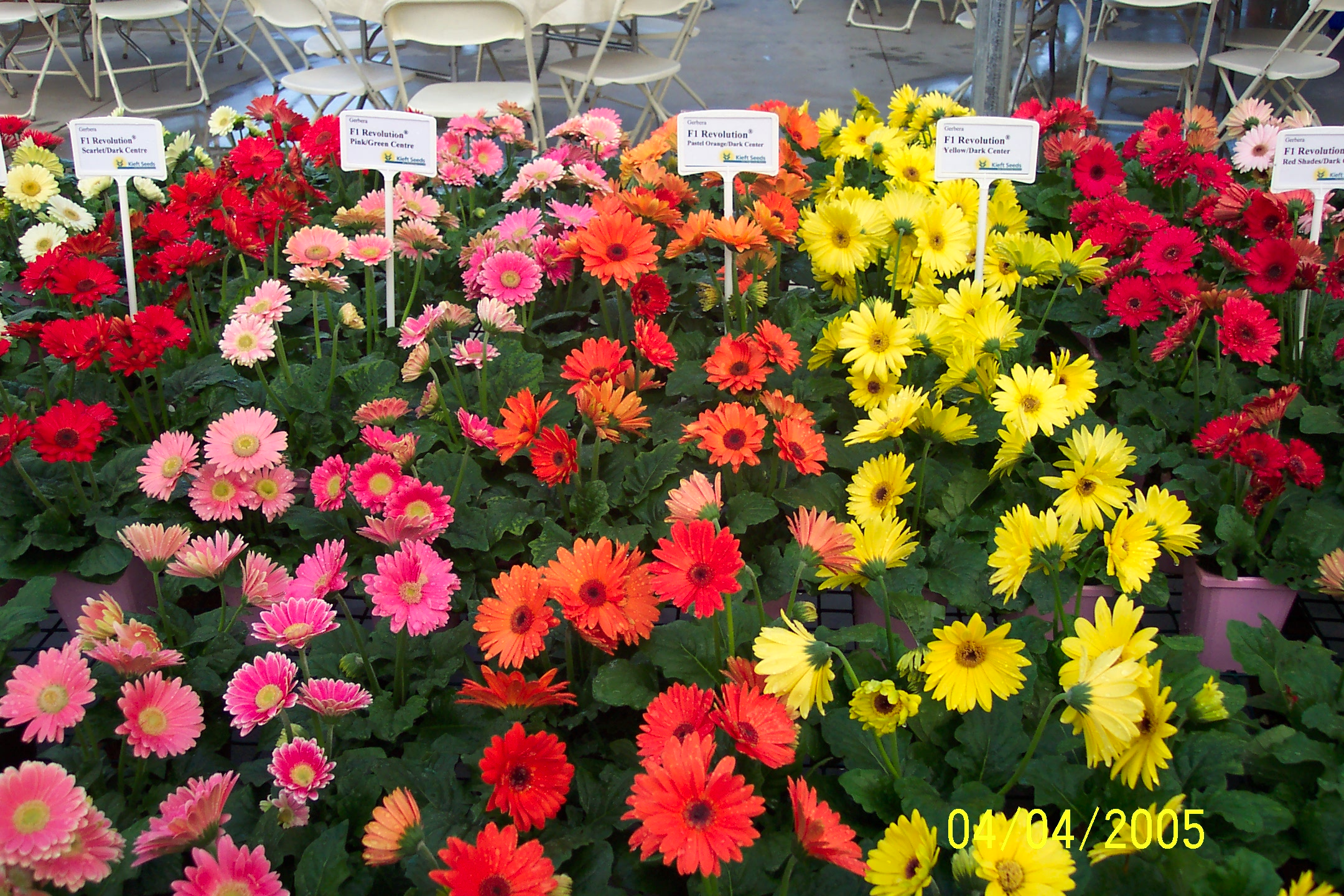
Gerbera - Gerbera jamesonii 'Revolution'

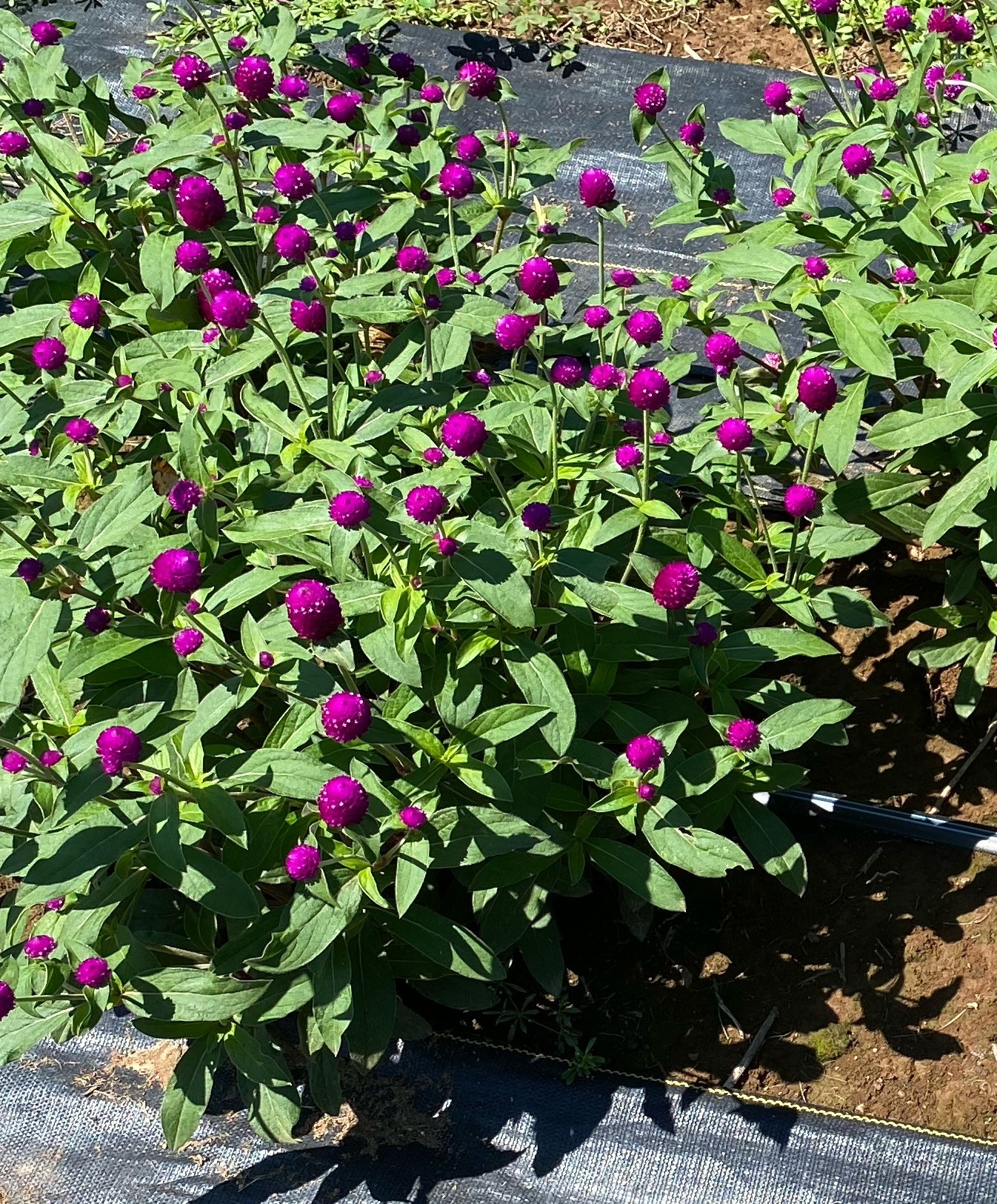
Globe amaranth - Gomphrena globosa

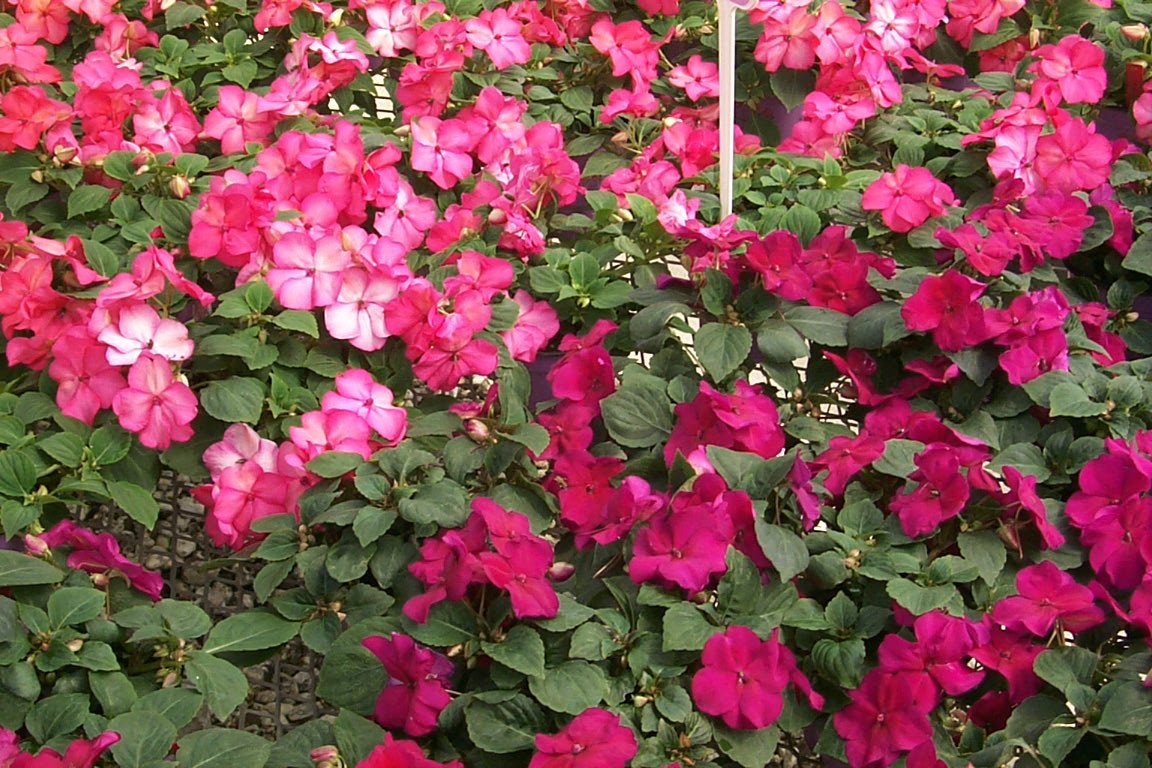
Impatiens - Impatiens walleriana

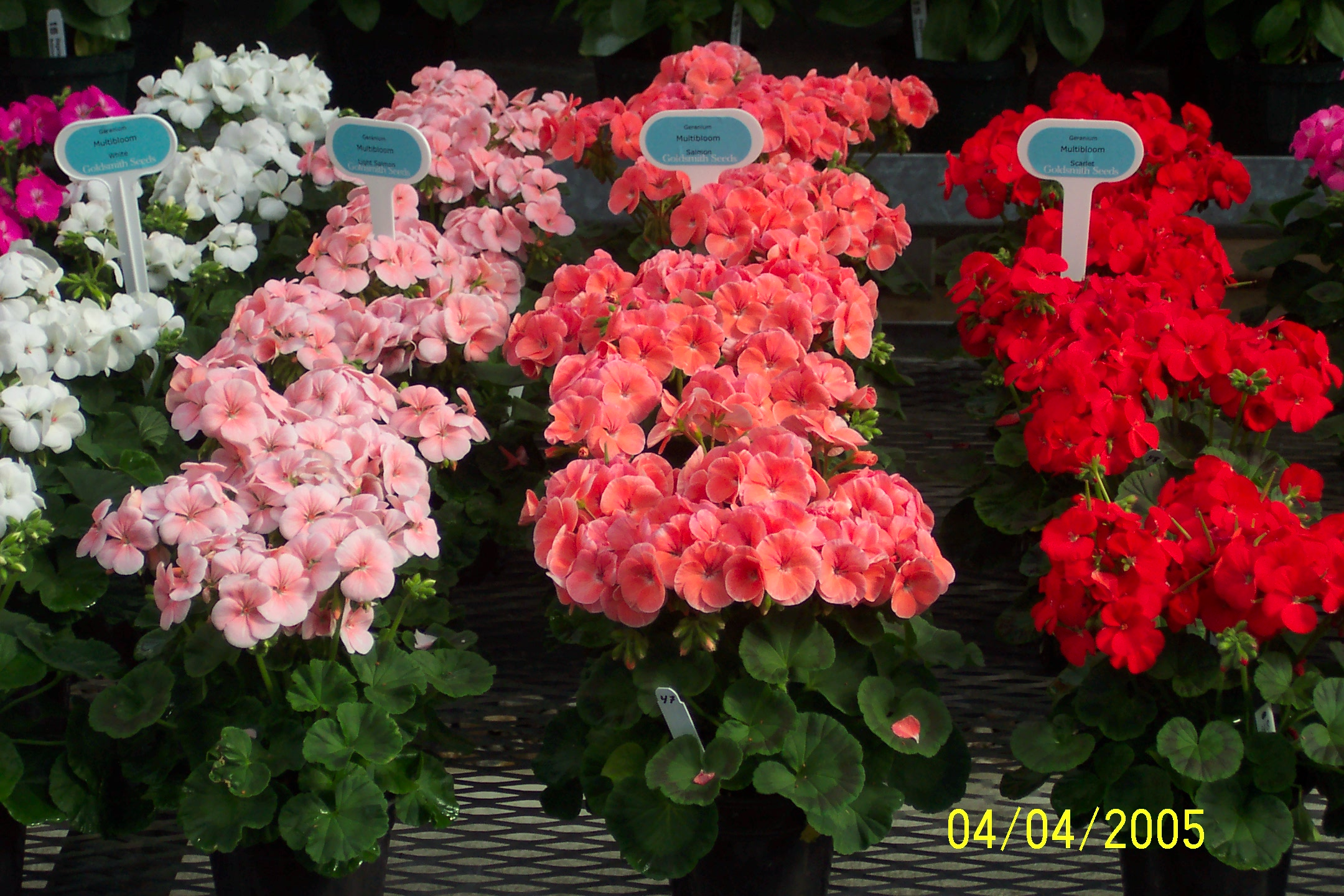
Geranium 'Multibloom' - Pelargonium x hortorum

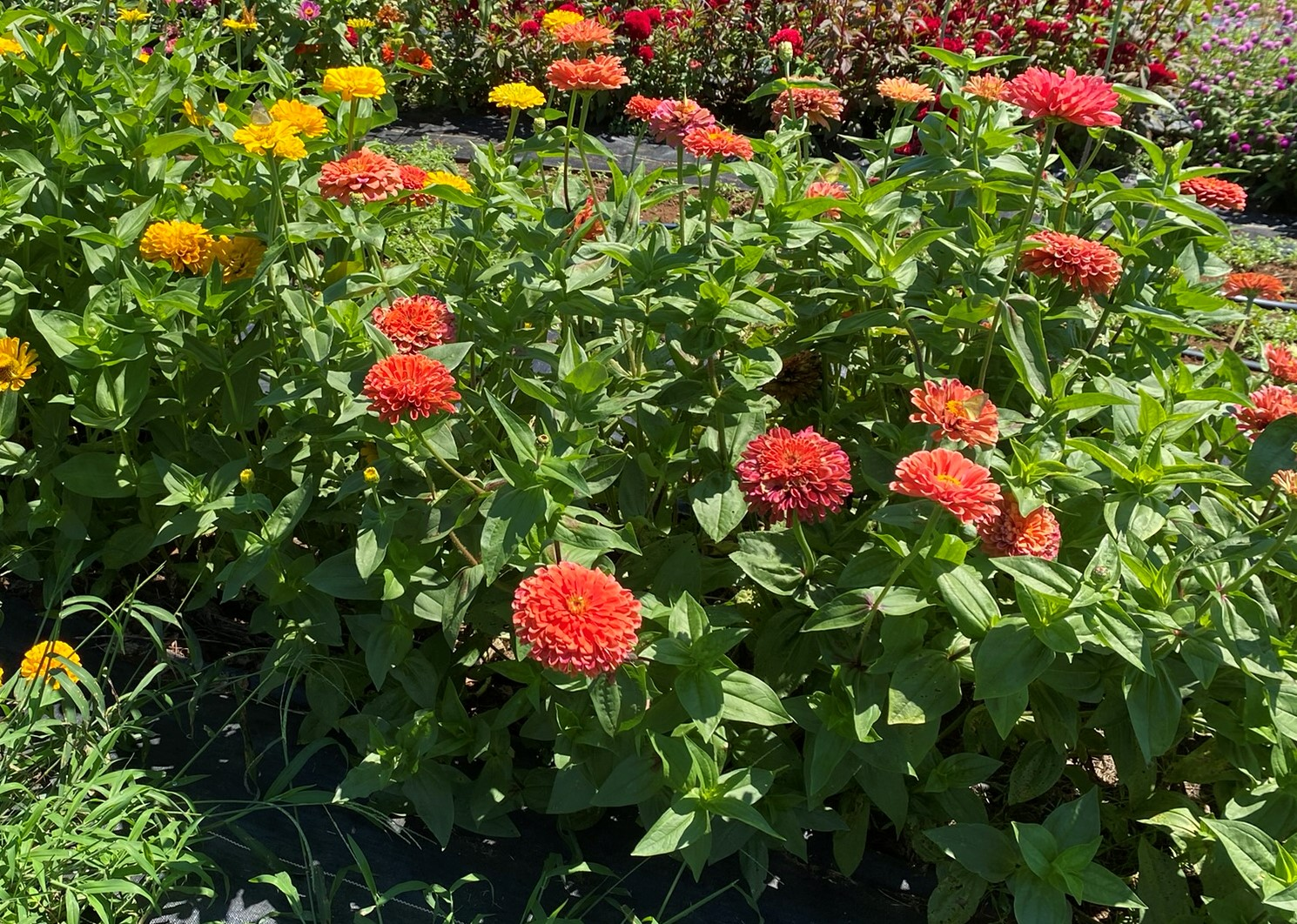
Zinnia - Zinnia elegans

== Bedding plant production ==
The production of bedding plants has changed dramatically over the last 50 years. In the U.S. in 1970, cut flowers were the top sellers, by far. Bedding plant production was increasing, but slowly. As cut flower production moved off-shore, greenhouse operators began to expand into bedding plant production. It seemed bedding plants might, also, move off-shore, but the plant quarantine standards prevented plants in soil from being shipped into the U.S. Local production of bedding plants was protected in the U.S. by important plant quarantine standards that protected all of U.S. agriculture. The quarantine laws helped, but the U.S. consumer wanted bedding plants, so production increased every year. Relatively inexpensive, seasonal greenhouses with a roof of polyethylene film were developed and optimized in the 1960s and 1970s and helped the business as well. In 2022, the wholesale value of bedding plants in the U.S. was nearly US$ 2.5 Billion.

The basic science for controlled-environment agriculture was started at universities and in industry in the Netherlands, the U.K., Germany, Denmark, etc. for vegetable, cut flower and potted flowering plants in the 1970s and 1980s. U.S. universities and industry applied the same science to bedding plants and potted flowering plants at the same time. This research developed environmental control practices, structures and equipment to optimize bedding plant production over the last 50 years. Plant breeders and plant collectors added new taxa annually to foster industry growth.

=== Greenhouse systems for bedding plants ===
==== 1960 ====
Bedding plants were grown in old glass greenhouses that had been used for cut flowers. The greenhouse had a coal boiler, hot water or steam system for heat, distributed through fin tubing on the periphery and possibly under benches. Ventilation was manual through ridge vents and possibly side vents. Environment control was based on the thermostat that controlled the heat. Almost all plants were grown from seed, hand transplanted into wooden flats with potting compost. Geranium cuttings were saved from a portion of the plants each year. Each operator had to make their own potting soil, usually 50% field soil, composted manure and possibly leaves, in a process that required 2-3 years to prepare. Plants were grown on the floor or on benches, hand watered with a hose and the compost supplied most nutrients to the plants. The old greenhouses had many structural posts so the plants had to be hand carried in and out of the greenhouse. Most plants were sold from the greenhouse directly to customers (a retail greenhouse), plants had to be manually removed from the wooden flats for the customers. The selling season lasted 4-6 weeks.

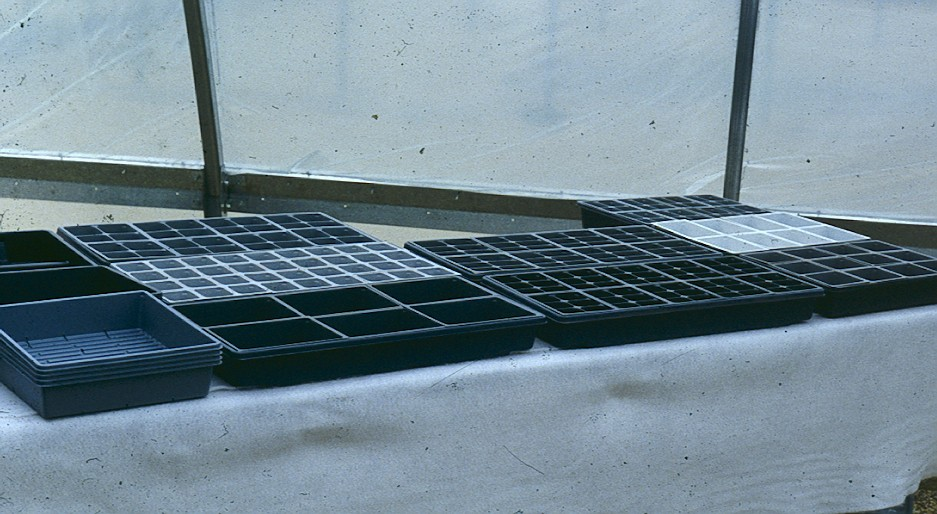
Plastic trays and packs (inserts) for bedding plants

==== 1970 ====
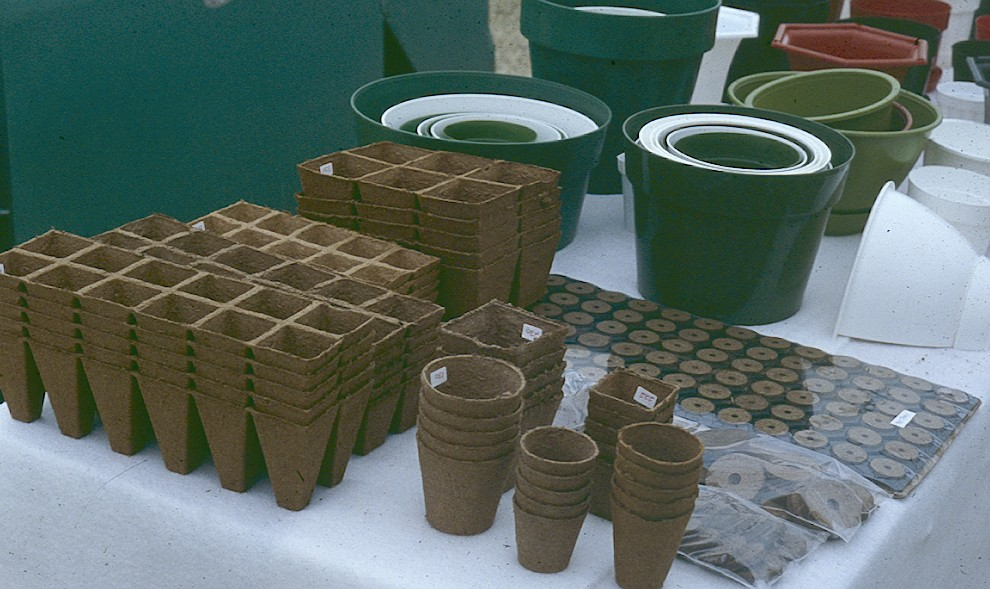
Pots for bedding plants

Many bedding plants were grown in the same old glass greenhouses with a boiler, fin tubing and manual ventilation. But the new greenhouses on the same property or at a new site were simpler and cheaper. The new greenhouses were made with pipe bows and covered with air-inflated double polyethylene roofs. These greenhouses could be erected by the greenhouse crew and allowed many new entrepreneurs to enter the bedding plant business. The structure, with a gravel floor, was usually 30 feet (9 m) wide and 100 feet (30 m) long, with an overhead heater (propane or natural gas) and fan ventilation. Thermostats operated the fan(s) and heater(s) for better environmental control. There were no internal supports for the greenhouse roof so carts and tractors could be used to move plants and supplies. Vacuum formed plastic trays and packs were now available and made bedding plant production more versatile. Some growers used soil-based potting soil (1 part sterilized field soil:1 part peat moss:1 part perlite) but progressive growers were using the Cornell peat-lite mix (1 part peat moss:1 part vermiculite). Most plants were grown from seed at the greenhouse and cuttings of geraniums, mums, etc., were available from specialty producers. The plastic trays and plastic hanging baskets were easy to transport in light trucks to garden centers and farm stores.

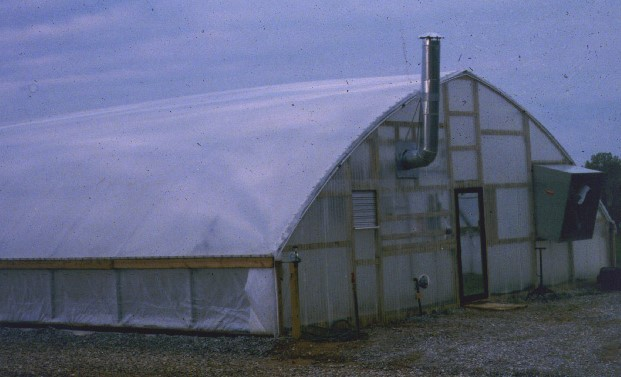
Air-inflated double polyethylene cover on quonset greenhouse with heater and ventilation fan.

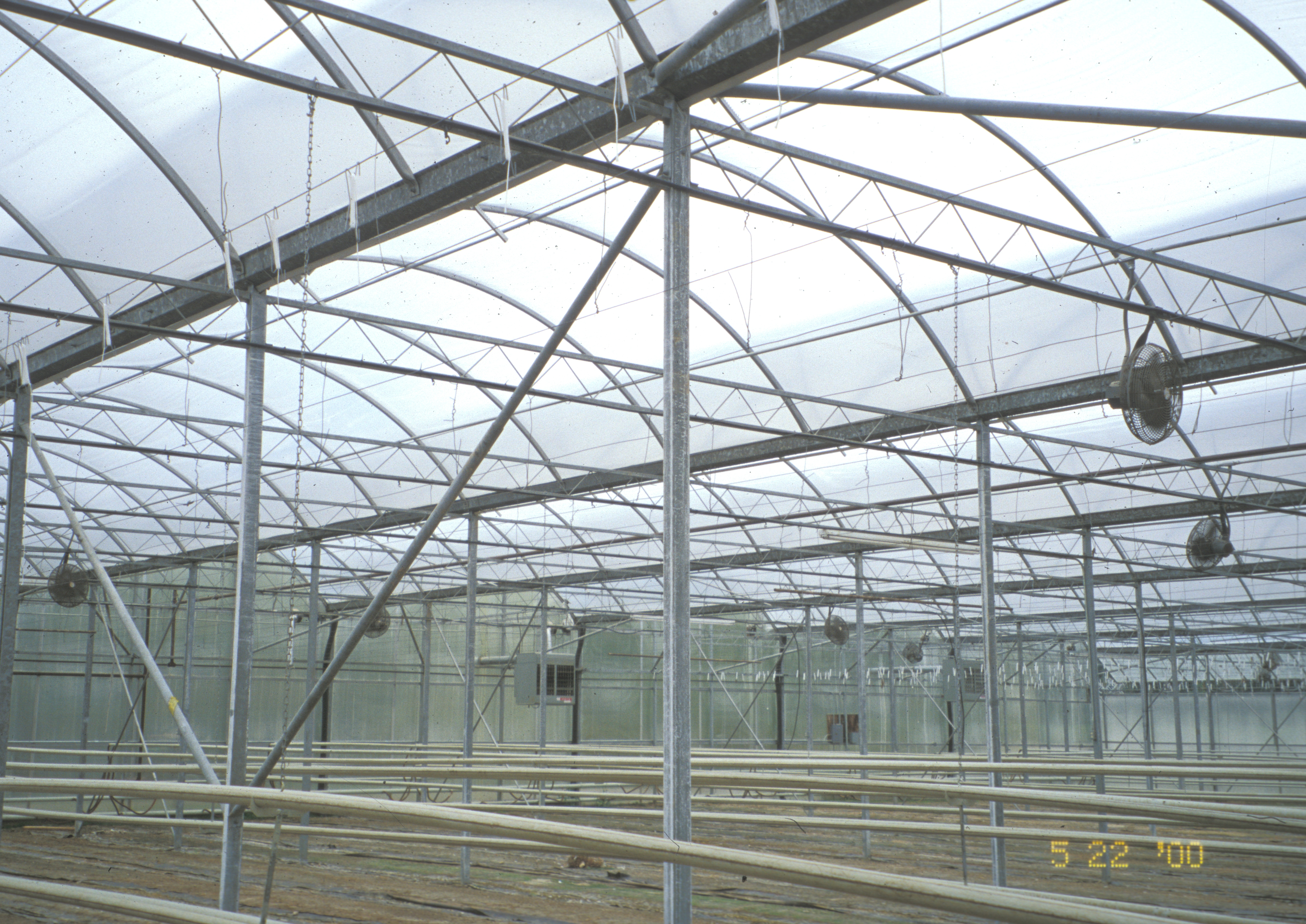
Gutter-connected double poly greenhouse with HAF fans

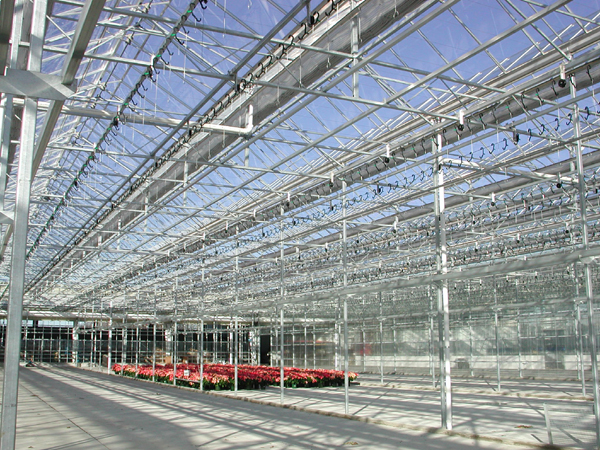
Modern gutter-connected glass greenhouse with open roof ventilation and concrete floors

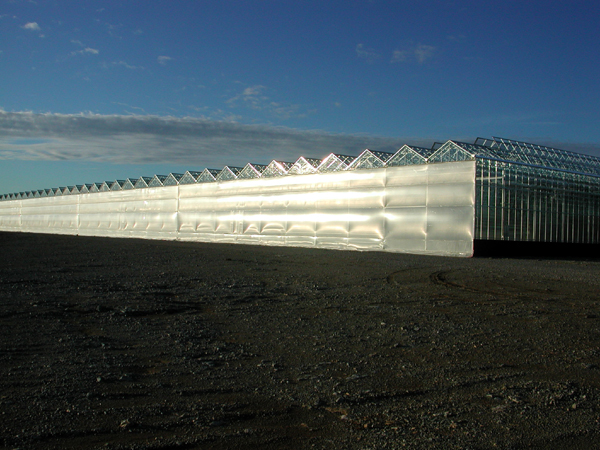
Modern glass greenhouse for bedding plants

==== 1990 ====
Only a few old greenhouses were used for bedding plants. Greenhouse manufacturers had developed gutter-connected double polyethylene greenhouses and added concrete walkways through the middle of the structure for cart transport. The structures are 1 to 10 acres (4000 - 40,000 m^{2}) in size with a large headhouse as a work space, material storage and loading dock. Overhead heaters, fan ventilation, air mixing fans and thermostats control the environment. Department stores and hardware stores have opened garden departments so bedding plant production continues to increase. There are multiple manufacturers of plastic trays, packs and pots that can be filled with standardized packaged potting soil with flat filling machines. Seedlings (plugs) and cuttings (young plants) are shipped to the production greenhouse from specialized propagation greenhouse businesses. The young plants are hand transplanted but mechanized transplanting is on the horizon. Drip irrigation is standard for large pots and hanging baskets. Water soluble fertilizer metered by injectors and standard soil (growing medium) tests help optimize plant nutrition. Pesticide applications are standard for insect, mite and disease management. Chemicals to control plant size are often applied to bedding plant cultivars. These bedding plant greenhouses would be used to grow garden mums for fall sales and poinsettias for Christmas.

==== 2010 ====
Bedding plant production has been consolidated into larger operations, 20 to 100 acres (80,000 - 400,000 m^{2}) in size, driven by ever increasing sales at hardware and department stores. Many large growers have built modern glass greenhouses, typical of controlled-environment agriculture, with open-roof natural ventilation to reduce summer energy consumption. Internal curtains were installed to reduce winter heating cost and to manage summer light levels. The structures have concrete floors throughout with in-floor heating and ebb-flood sub-irrigation. The concrete floors create a closed system for fertilizer and chemical runoff to meet water safety standards. The greenhouse environment is controlled by a computer management system. Bedding plant production begins with cool season plants for early sales and moves forward with warm season plants for later sales. Plugs and cuttings are shipped from specialty producers and transplanted by robotic transplanting machines into potting soil formulated on-site that is transferred to flat/pot filling machines just before transplanting. Robotic machines label every container with bar codes for cash registers at the point of sale. Plants are put on carts, transported to the greenhouse and placed on the floor. Bedding plants are usually watered with boom irrigation rather than ebb flood. Water soluble fertilizer metered by injectors and standard soil (growing medium) tests help optimize plant nutrition. Growth regulating chemicals are applied to control plant height. Pests and diseases are managed with pesticides and biological controls.
