= Yard (disambiguation) =

A yard is a measurement of length in the British imperial and US customary systems of measurement, that comprises 3 feet or 36 inches (91 cm).

Yard may also refer to:

== Parcels of land ==
- Yard (land), a land area traditionally adjacent to one or more buildings
  - Backyard, the property behind a house
  - Front yard, the property in front of a house
- Rail yard, a complex of railroad tracks for railroad cars and locomotives

== Places ==
- Scotland Yard or The Yard, headquarters for London's Metropolitan Police Service
- The Yard (adventure playground), a former playground in Minneapolis, Minnesota
- Yard Peak, a summit in Utah
- Yard, Texas
- Yard (Portland, Oregon), an apartment building
- The Yard (Hot Springs, Virginia), a historic estate home
- Yards, Virginia and West Virginia
- The Yards (Washington, D.C.), a development on the Anacostia River waterfront
- The Yard (Howard University), a quadrangle on the campus of Howard University in Washington, D.C.
- The Yard Theatre, a theatre and music venue in London, England

== Other uses ==
- Yard (sailing), a spar on a traditional sailing ship
- YARD (software), a documentation generator for the Ruby programming language
- The Yard (2011 TV series)
- The Yard (2016 TV series) or The Quad
- Yard (album), 2023 album by Slow Pulp
- The Yard (podcast), a podcast hosted by popular streamer Ludwig Ahgren
- Yards Brewing Company, a brewery in Philadelphia, Pennsylvania, United States
- Megalithic yard, a theoretical unit of prehistoric measurement
- Yard glass, a beer glass about a yard deep
- 1,000,000,000 or yard

== People with the surname ==
- Douglas Yard, judge of the Family Division of the Court of Queen's Bench of Manitoba
- Ernie Yard (1941–2004), Scottish association footballer
- Molly Yard (1912–2005), American feminist of the late 20th century
- Robert Sterling Yard (1861–1945), American writer, journalist, and wilderness activist

== See also ==
- A yard is a common Slang term for money when discussing the United States dollar. When discussing small bills, a "yard" is a hundred dollar bill. In larger, Foreign exchange market discussions, a yard is a billion dollars.
- Barnyard, near a farm's barn
- Brickyard, a place where bricks are made or stored
- Churchyard, near a church
- Courtyard, surrounded by walls
- Cubic yard, a unit of volume
- Graveyard, cemetery or burial ground
- The Longest Yard (disambiguation)
- Schoolyard, are for teaching, extracurricular and other activities at a school
- Shipyard (disambiguation)
- Square yard, a unit of area
- Stockyard (disambiguation)
- Stableyard, near a stable for horses
- Wrecking yard, also known as a scrapyard or junkyard
- Yardie, a Jamaican slang term
