= Stari Dvor, Škofja Loka =

Stari Dvor
- Location in Slovenia
- Coordinates: 46°10′7.29″N 14°19′33.50″E
- Country: Slovenia
- Traditional region: Upper Carniola
- Statistical region: Upper Carniola
- Municipality: Škofja Loka
- Elevation: 353 m (1,158 ft)

Stari Dvor (pronounced [ˈstaːɾi ˈdʋɔɾ]; German: Stariduor or Staridwor) is a former settlement in the Municipality of Škofja Loka in the Upper Carniola region of Slovenia. It now corresponds to the neighborhood of Stari Dvor in Škofja Loka.

== Name ==
The name Stari Dvor literally means 'old manor'. Dvor is a relatively common toponym in Slovenia and, in addition to 'manor', may also refer to a farm with outbuildings, an estate, a (fenced-in) courtyard, or a barnyard, as well as a medieval agricultural estate comprising up to 40 farms. The name refers to a manor belonging to the Dominion of Loka that stood in the area in the 11th century. No trace of the manor remains today. In the 19th century the German name was Stariduor or Staridwor.

== History ==
The population of the village grew rapidly in the late 19th century, with a 60% increase from 1869 to 1880, due to the railroad station established in 1870. After the Second World War, a refrigerator factory was established in Stari Dvor in 1946. A prewar sawmill and wartime military base were converted to a wood processing plant, along with a technical school for wood processing, in 1948. By 1961, the population of Stari Dvor was nearly 10 times greater than it had been a century earlier because of the industries attracted by the railroad. Stari Dvor was annexed by the town of Škofja Loka in 1970, ending its existence as a separate settlement.

== Notable people ==
Notable people that were born or lived in Stari Dvor include:

- Slavko Prevec (1906–1944), physician
