= Chambéry Courthouse =

Judicial building in Savoie, France

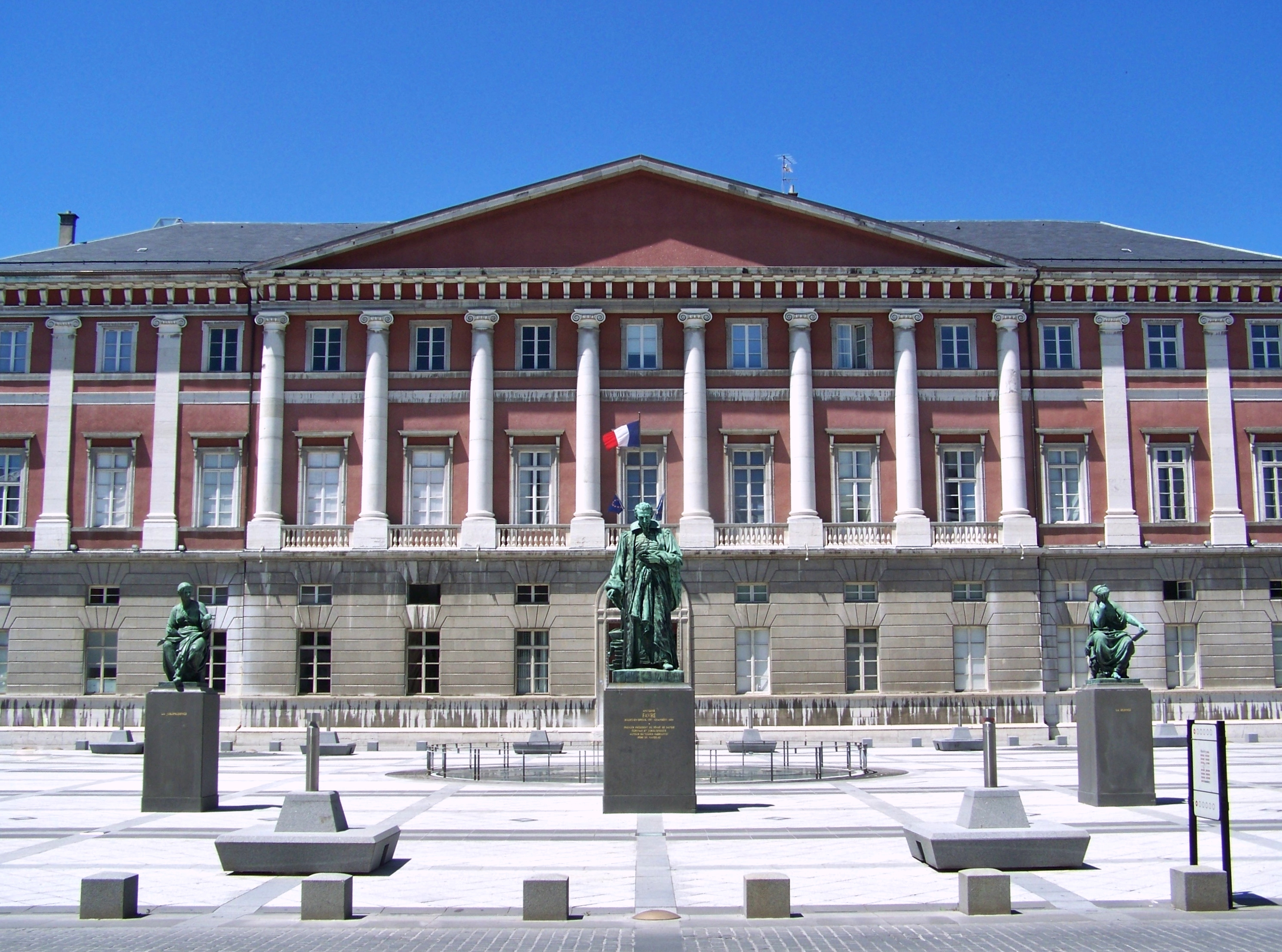
- Interactive map of Chambéry Courthouse
- Location: Chambéry, Savoie, France
- Coordinates: 45°34′07″N 5°55′07″E
- Designer: Pierre-Louis Besson; Pierre Spurgazzi
- Type: Courthouse
- Beginning date: 1850
- Completion date: 1860
- Dedicated date: Kingdom of Sardinia
- Style: Sardinian neo-classicism Owner: French State; MH listed (1984, partially)

The Chambéry courthouse is a judicial building located in France, in the town of Chambéry, in the Savoie department, within the Auvergne-Rhône-Alpes region.

The government of the Sardinian Kingdom decided to construct a courthouse in Chambéry in 1848. Construction began in 1850 in the presence of King Victor Emmanuel II and Queen Adelaide. Spanning ten years, the building was completed in 1860, coinciding with the proclamation of the results of the 29 April plebiscite on Savoie's annexation to France.

Following the annexation, neither Sardinian sovereign Victor Emmanuel nor French Emperor Napoleon III, who was not involved in the project, chose to inaugurate the courthouse officially. Instead, its inaugural moment came on 28 June 1860, with the formal installation of the first Attorney General.

Currently, the Chambéry courthouse houses the Chambéry Court of Appeal and has been partially listed as a historic monument since 1984.

== History ==
=== Origins ===
Before the courthouse's construction, justice in Chambéry was administered in various locations over the centuries.

When Chambéry became the political capital of the County of Savoy in 1295, the Resident Council held court at the castle, later renamed the Sovereign Council during the reign of Count Aymon of Savoy in the 14th century. During the French occupation (1536–1559), the Sovereign Council was replaced by a Parliament established by Francis I, later declared a Sovereign Court under Henry II. After the occupation ended, Emmanuel Philibert of Savoy established the Sovereign Senate of Savoy, which remained for nearly three centuries in the Dominican convent. This building, now gone, stood near the current courthouse site.

During Savoie's first annexation to France (1792–1815), the Criminal Tribunal of Mont Blanc replaced the Senate and operated from the Hôtel d’Allinges on Rue Juiverie. This was the only period in Chambéry's history when it fell under the jurisdiction of Grenoble.

After 1815, the Senate of Savoy resumed operations at the Saint-Dominique convent before relocating to the Hôtel d’Allinges in 1830 due to the convent's dilapidation. In 1848, following the Albertine Statute, which established a Senate as an upper chamber, the 4 March edict transformed the Senate of Savoy into a Royal Court of Appeal. That same year, plans were made to build a courthouse for the court's activities.

=== Construction ===
The plans for the future building were initially entrusted to the Chambéry architect Pierre-Louis Besson. However, the Sardinian civil engineering inspector, Ernesto Melano, later favored the Piedmontese engineer Pierre Spurgazzi, who nevertheless based his work on Besson's original plans.

The site of the former Dominican convent could not be considered for the project, as the city of Chambéry had allocated that area for the construction of a covered market, which still exists today as the Halles de Chambéry. It was ultimately decided to reduce the edge of the Verney garden near the town to accommodate the future courthouse. This location was chosen both because it was the only space of sufficient size for such a building and due to its proximity to the prisons, as prisoner transfers were conducted on foot through the town center.

The cornerstone was laid on 27 May 1850, by King Victor Emmanuel II, accompanied by Queen Adelaide of Habsburg-Lorraine, the prince, and several ministers. A rosewood box containing ten gold and silver coins and medals bearing the effigies of King Charles Albert and Victor Emmanuel II was placed in the foundation stone. The ceremony was attended by Chambéry's syndic and Bishop Billiet.

Construction of the courthouse was spread over the following decade, but the premises were occupied as they were completed, until 1860.

=== Inauguration ===
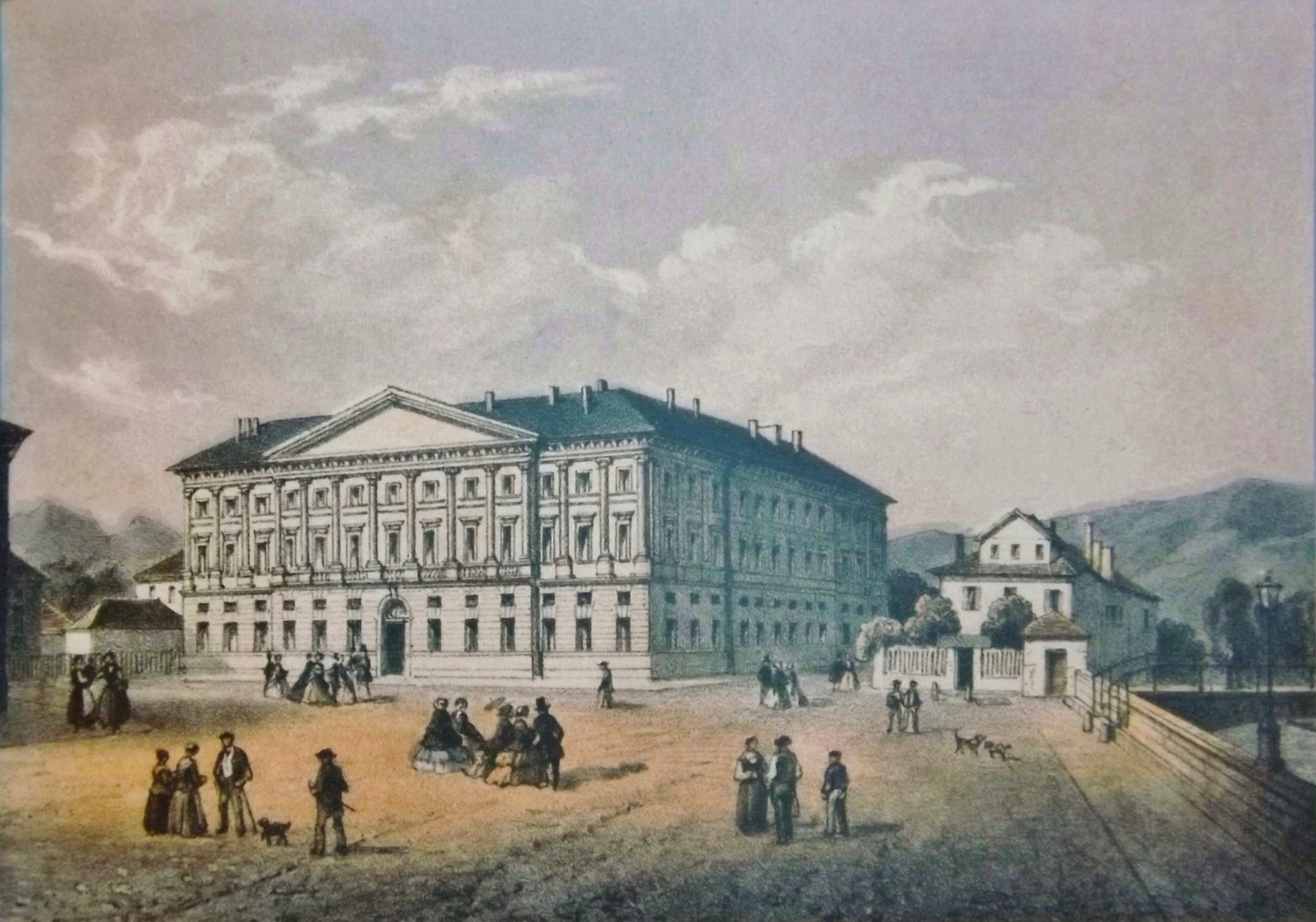
The Chambéry courthouse, circa 1860 (lithograph by Isidore Deroy).

The courthouse was never officially inaugurated. Instead, its historic role began on 29 April 1860, when the results of the plebiscite on Savoie's annexation to France were proclaimed in its grand ceremonial hall.

Although the annexation became official in June 1860, neither the Sardinian administration, which no longer governed Chambéry, nor the French administration, which had not commissioned the building, officially inaugurated it.

The installation of the first French Attorney General of the new Imperial Court on 28 June 1860, marked the courthouse's de facto inauguration.

== Description ==
The Chambéry courthouse is a grand building characterized by Sardinian architecture and a neo-classical style, featuring numerous columns.

Its facades are richly colored, both externally and internally, as it includes an inner courtyard surrounded by porticoes and wall-engaged columns.

=== Exterior facades ===
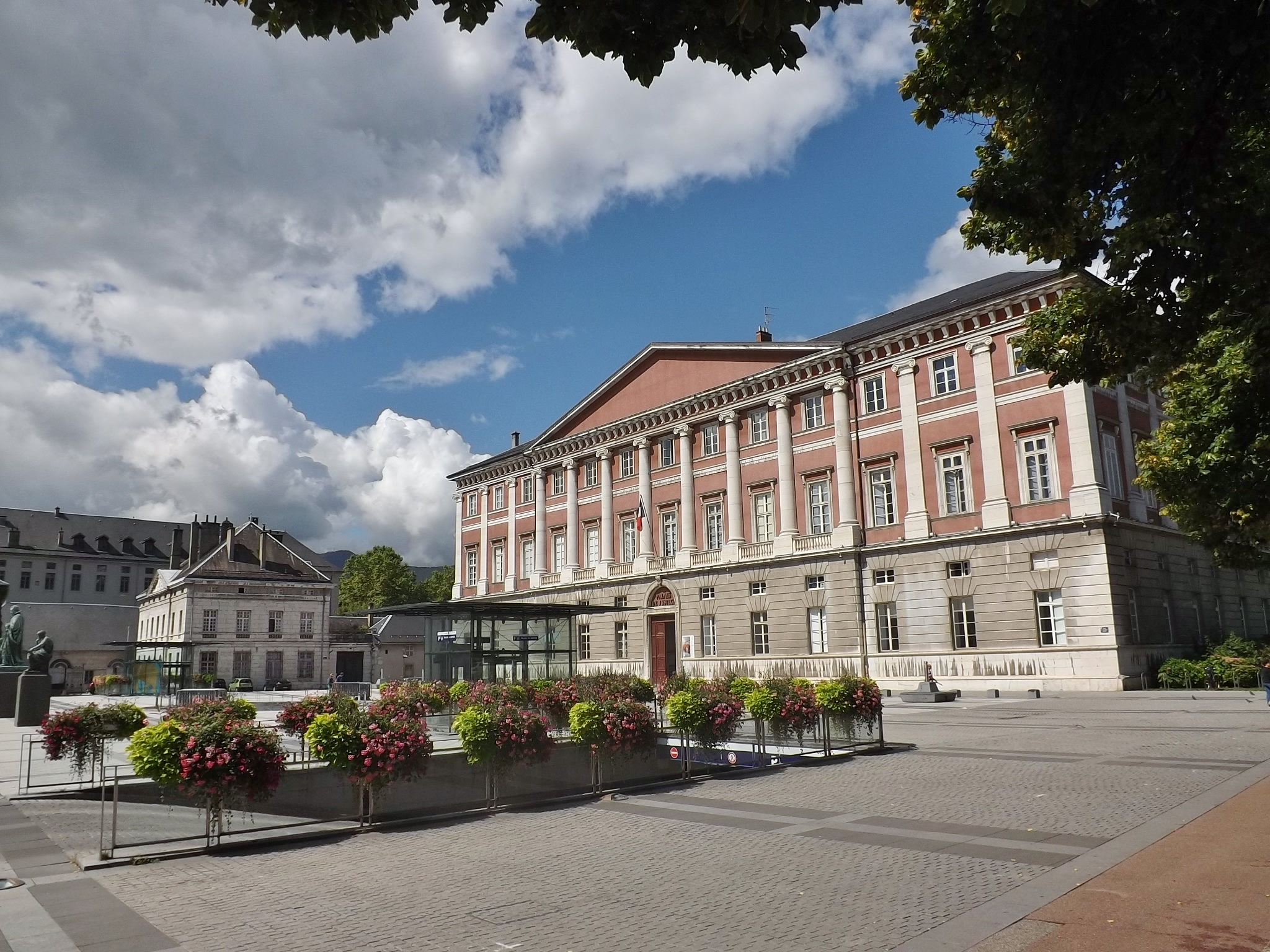
Main facade of the courthouse, featuring the central Ionic columns below the pediment.

The courthouse's exterior facades consist of two distinct sections: a stone base on the ground floor and thirteen "Sardinian red" bays on the first and second floors. This vibrant color was applied during restoration work in 1976, as the walls were originally covered with a yellow coating.

While the overall structure follows this design, the center of the main facade includes specific architectural highlights. It features a protruding section (avant-corps) topped with a triangular pediment in the same Sardinian red as the bays.

The entrance doors, crafted from solid wood, are located at the center of this protruding section. On the upper level, the protrusion includes seven bays out of the thirteen on the main facade, with three on either side. These seven bays are separated by engaged Ionic columns, whereas all other bays across the four facades are separated by pilasters. On the main facade, the similar size and color of the pilasters and columns create an impression of architectural continuity. A stone balustrade is positioned between the base and the seven bays of the protruding section.

The pediment above the central section features a plain Sardinian red background without any decoration. Although decorative elements were initially planned, political and financial uncertainties related to Savoie's anticipated annexation prevented their realization.

=== Inner courtyard ===
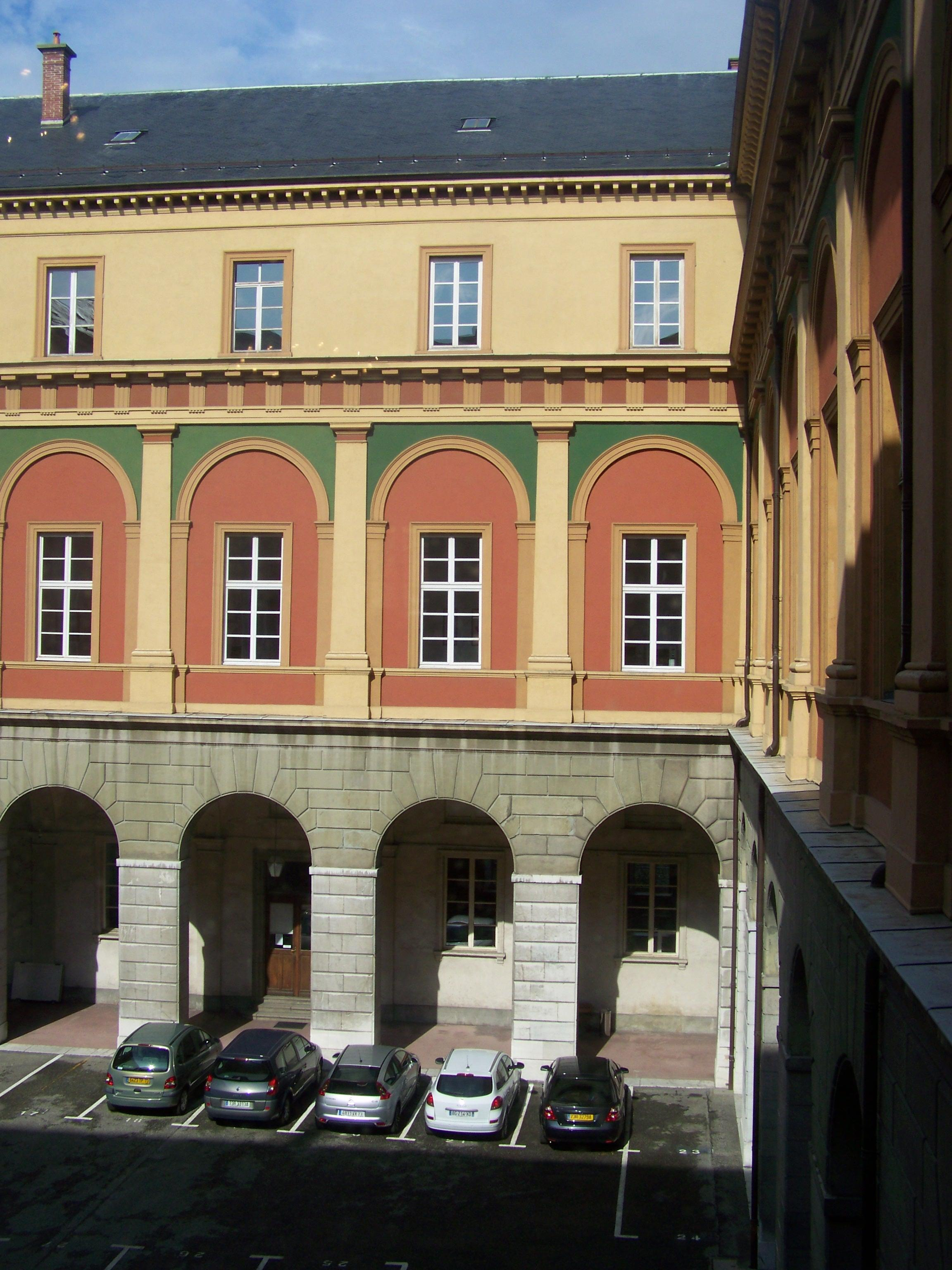
Facades of the inner courtyard.

The facades of the inner courtyard also feature vibrant, predominantly warm colors, with Sardinian red accompanied by prominent yellows.

Unlike the exterior facades, the courtyard's stone bases include porticoes. Additionally, the pilasters on the upper level are limited to the first floor, with the second floor left without them. The first-floor windows are topped with arches, including touches of green at their upper edges.

The courtyard's style is influenced by the works of Antonio da Sangallo the Younger and Andrea Palladio.

Originally, the courthouse was designed to be traversable, with a secondary entrance located directly opposite the main entrance, on the side facing Verney Park. This design turned the inner courtyard into a public passageway between the city and the gardens. However, this function was restricted in 1960, when access was limited to the building's opening hours, and later eliminated with the permanent closure of the rear entrance.

The inner courtyard includes a ground-floor arcade gallery. The galleries run along all four facades of the building, providing direct access to the ground-floor rooms and upper floors via lettered doors and staircases (A to I). However, the main staircase, known as the "Escalier d'honneur," which leads to the reception hall and the solemn audience chamber, is located immediately to the right of the main entrance, preceding entry into the courtyard galleries.

=== Points of architectural interest ===
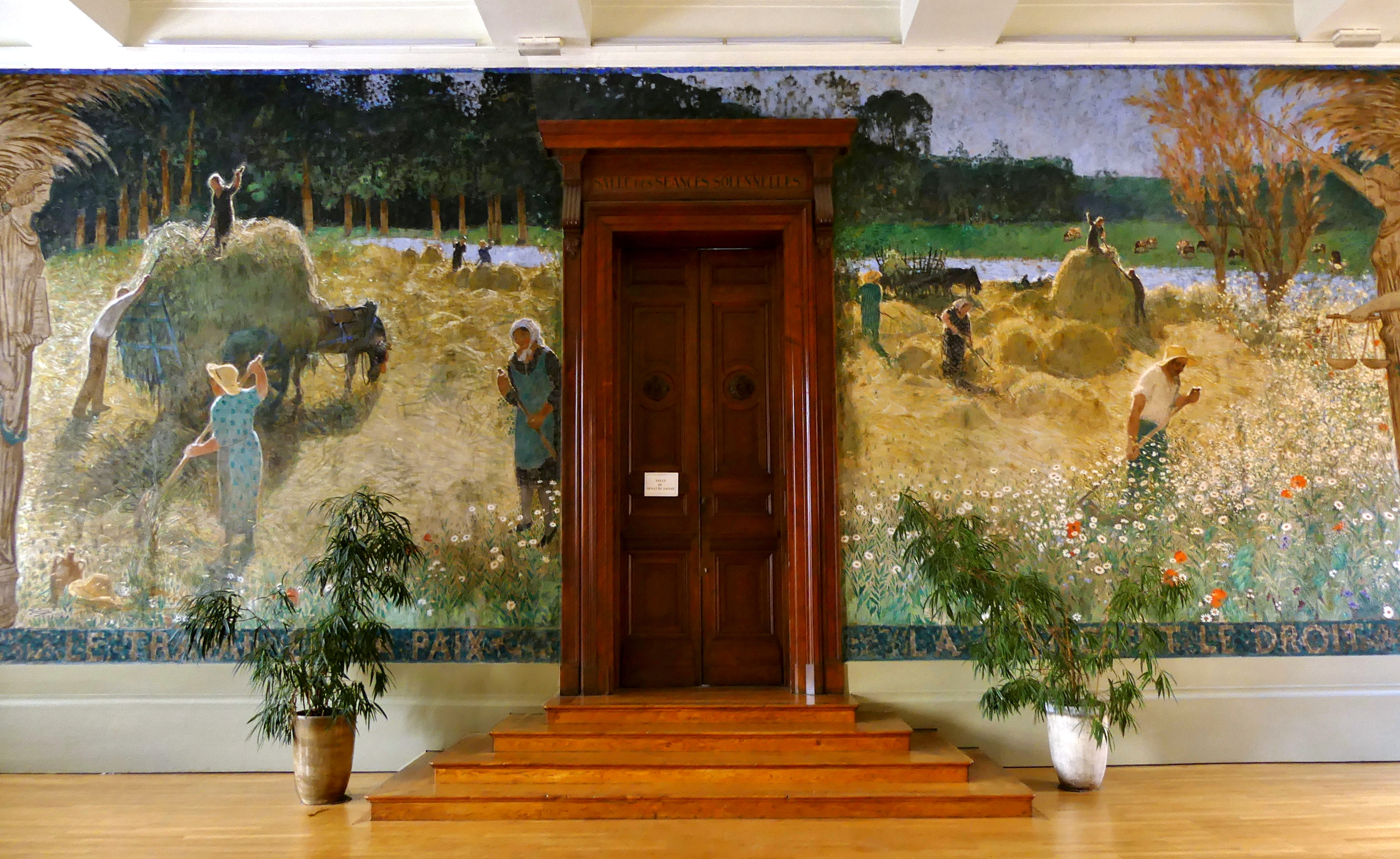
Fresco in the Hall of Lost Steps.

==== Main staircase ====
Immediately to the right upon entering through the grand wooden doors, the main staircase leads exclusively to the first floor, where the balconies and columns of the main facade are situated. This staircase is designed with two flights and an intermediate landing.

==== Hall of lost steps ====
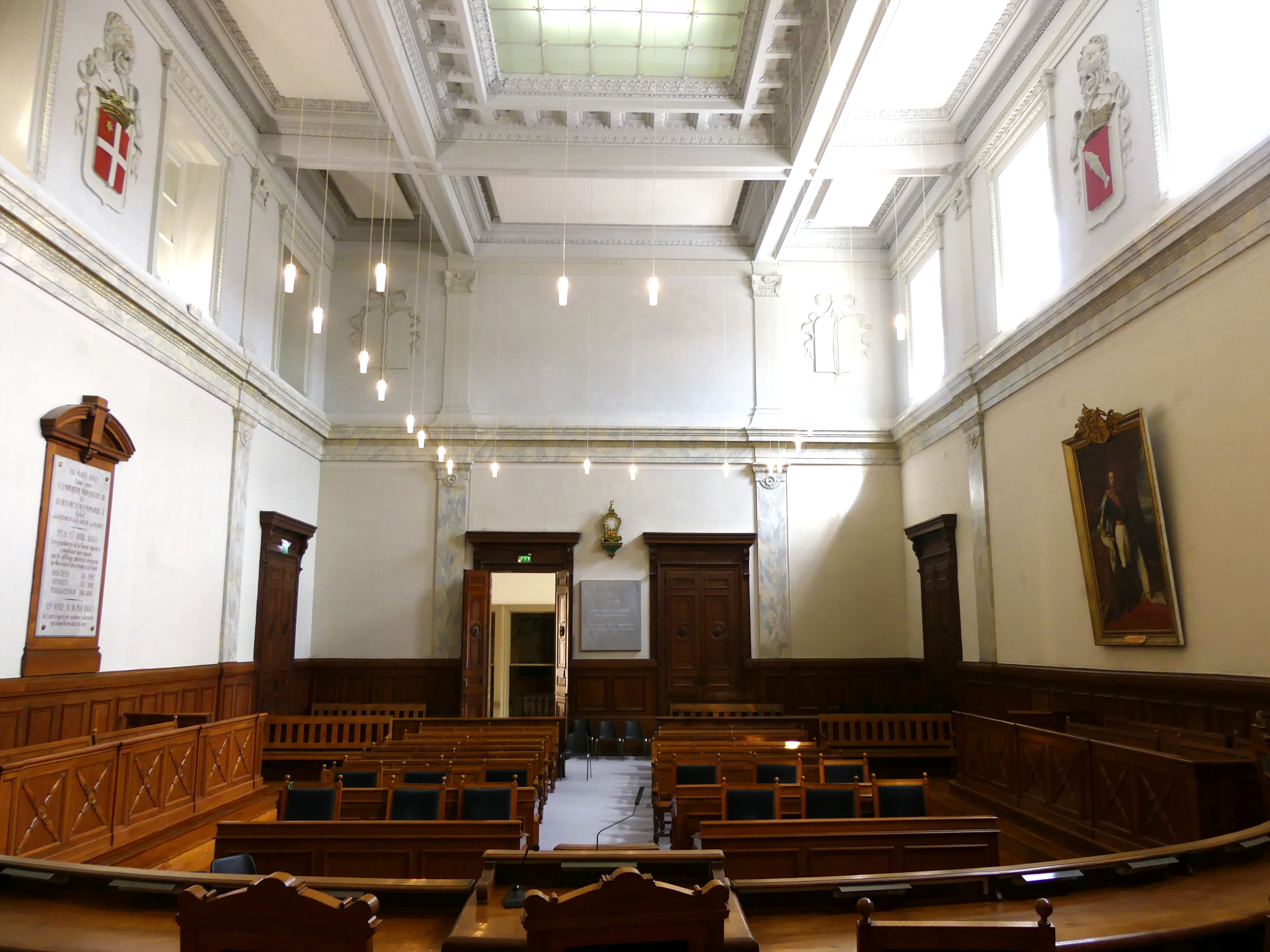
Solemn Audience Hall.

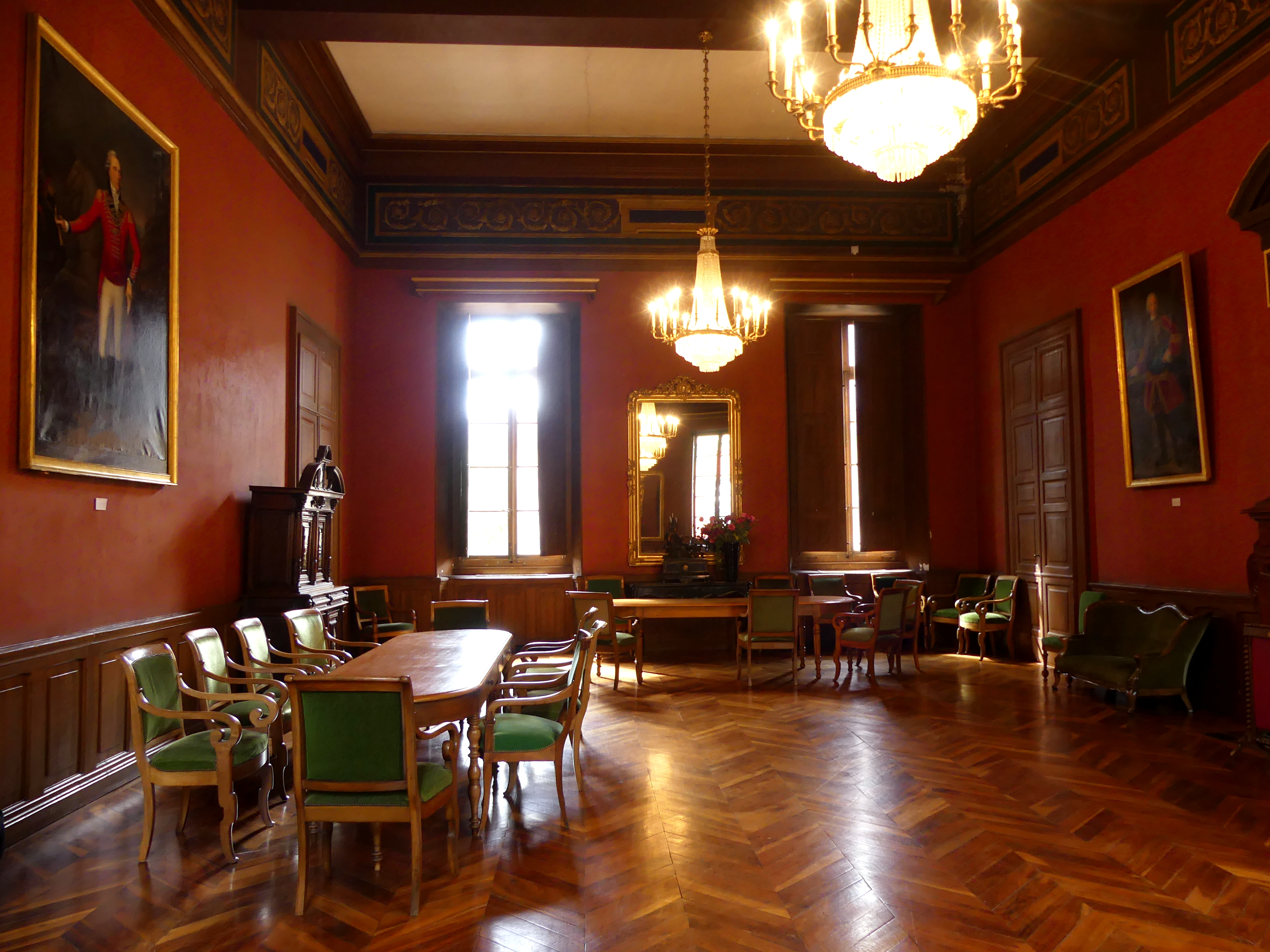
Reception room, known as the Napoleon salon.

The first room on the upper floor, accessed via the grand staircase, is the vestibule, also known as salle des pas perdus (the Hall of Lost Steps). Since 1939, this room has featured a large fresco covering one of its walls. Painted by the Parisian artist Pierre Eugène Montézin, the fresco is themed "Work and Peace" and "Justice and Law," with these titles inscribed at the bottom of the artwork. It notably depicts haymaking scenes in the fields and frames the main entrance door to the solemn audience chamber.

The Hall of Lost Steps also houses three paintings. The first, painted in 1899 by Chambéry-born artist Jacques Morion, depicts the Lac du Bourget. The second is a monumental piece created in 1800 by Laurent Pécheux, the official painter of the King of Piedmont-Sardinia, titled Auguste faisant un sacrifice au Dieu Mars (Augustus Offering a Sacrifice to the God Mars). Lastly, there is a painting by Eugène Leygue entitled The Betrothed.

==== Solemn audience chamber ====
The Salle des Séances Solennelles, also called the Solemn Audience Chamber, is located behind the Hall of Lost Steps, specifically behind the fresco. It is here that, on 29 April 1860, at 2:00 pm, the results of the referendum formalizing Savoie's annexation to France were proclaimed. A marble plaque commemorates the referendum, its results, and the proclamation on one of the side walls. Opposite this, a portrait of Emperor Napoleon III, gifted by the emperor himself to the court of appeal, hangs prominently.

At the far end of the chamber, behind the magistrates' podium, are the mace and silver staffs once used by ushers of the former Senate of Savoie.

==== Gallery ====
From the Hall of Lost Steps, a gallery runs alongside the Solemn Audience Chamber, leading to the Napoleon Salon. The gallery features several paintings, the most notable of which is located at the far end. Painted in 1863 by Stanislas Loyer, it depicts Saint Francis de Sales Converting Two Heretics.

Additionally, the chasuble of Saint Francis de Sales is displayed against one of the gallery's side walls.

==== Napoleon salon ====
At the gallery's opposite end lies the Napoleon Salon, which opens onto the west facade of the courthouse. It serves as the reception hall for the Court of Appeal. The salon derives its name from the presence of a bust of Emperor Napoleon I, prominently placed on a monumental fireplace.

Flanking the fireplace are portraits of two Savoian sovereigns, painted by Maria Giovanna Clementi, also known as La Clementina.

==== Library ====
The courthouse also houses a library, referred to as the Library of the Court of Appeal or Bibliothèque Lamartine. It was previously the repository for the archives of the Senate of Savoie, which were transferred to the Departmental Archives of Savoie in 1937.

== Protections ==
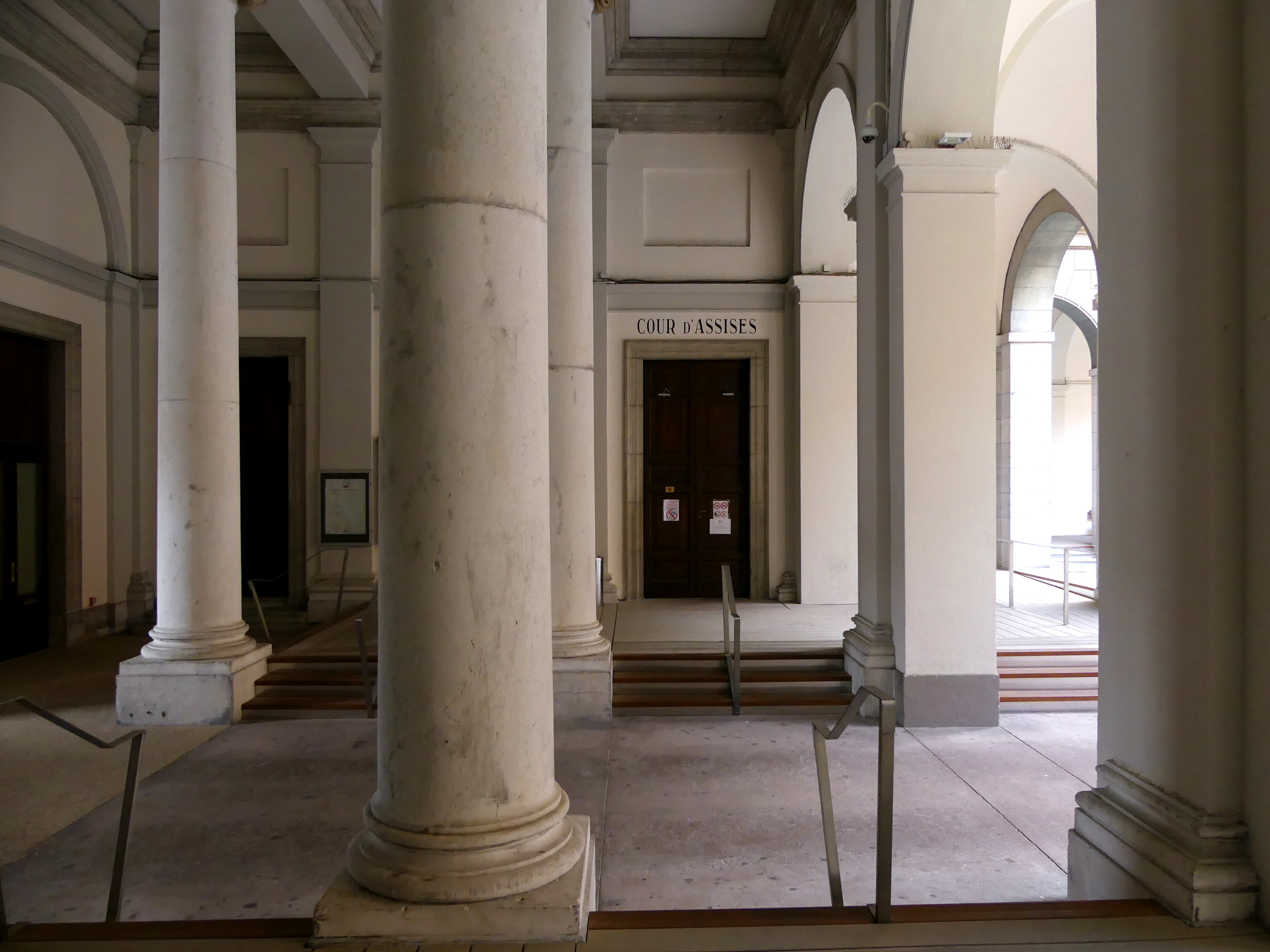
Gallery with arcades at the entrance.

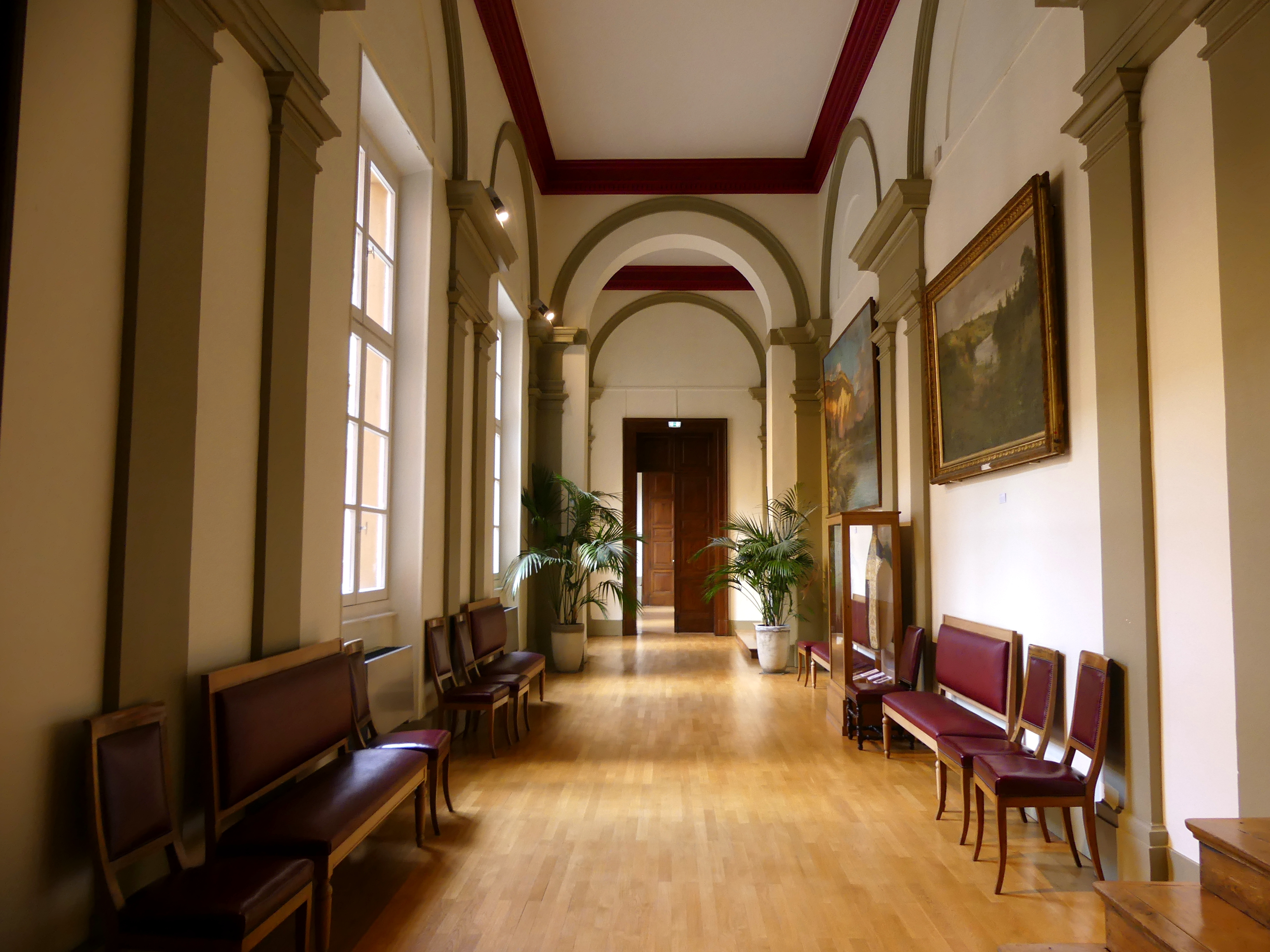
Second-floor gallery.

The Chambéry courthouse has been partially listed as a historical monument since 29 August 1984. The architectural elements under protection include the facades and roofs facing the exterior and the inner courtyard, the arcade gallery, the two peristyles, the grand staircase, the solemn audience chamber, and the two southern galleries on the first floor.

Additionally, seven pieces of movable property, inventoried in the Palissy database and protected as historical monuments, are housed within the courthouse:

- The chasuble of Saint Francis de Sales (16th century), displayed in one of the first-floor galleries and listed in 1999.
- The cartel and console of the wall clock (18th century), located in the Solemn Audience Chamber and classified in 1978.
- A painting of a presumed portrait of Victor Amadeus III, painted by La Clementina (18th century), located in the Napoleon Salon and classified in 1978.
- A painting of a presumed portrait of Charles Emmanuel III, also by La Clementina (18th century), located in the Napoleon Salon and classified in 1978.
- Two double-body enamel-decorated armoires (19th century), located in the Napoleon Salon and listed in 1999.
- The maces of the former Senate of Savoie (19th century), located in the Solemn Audience Chamber and classified in 1978.
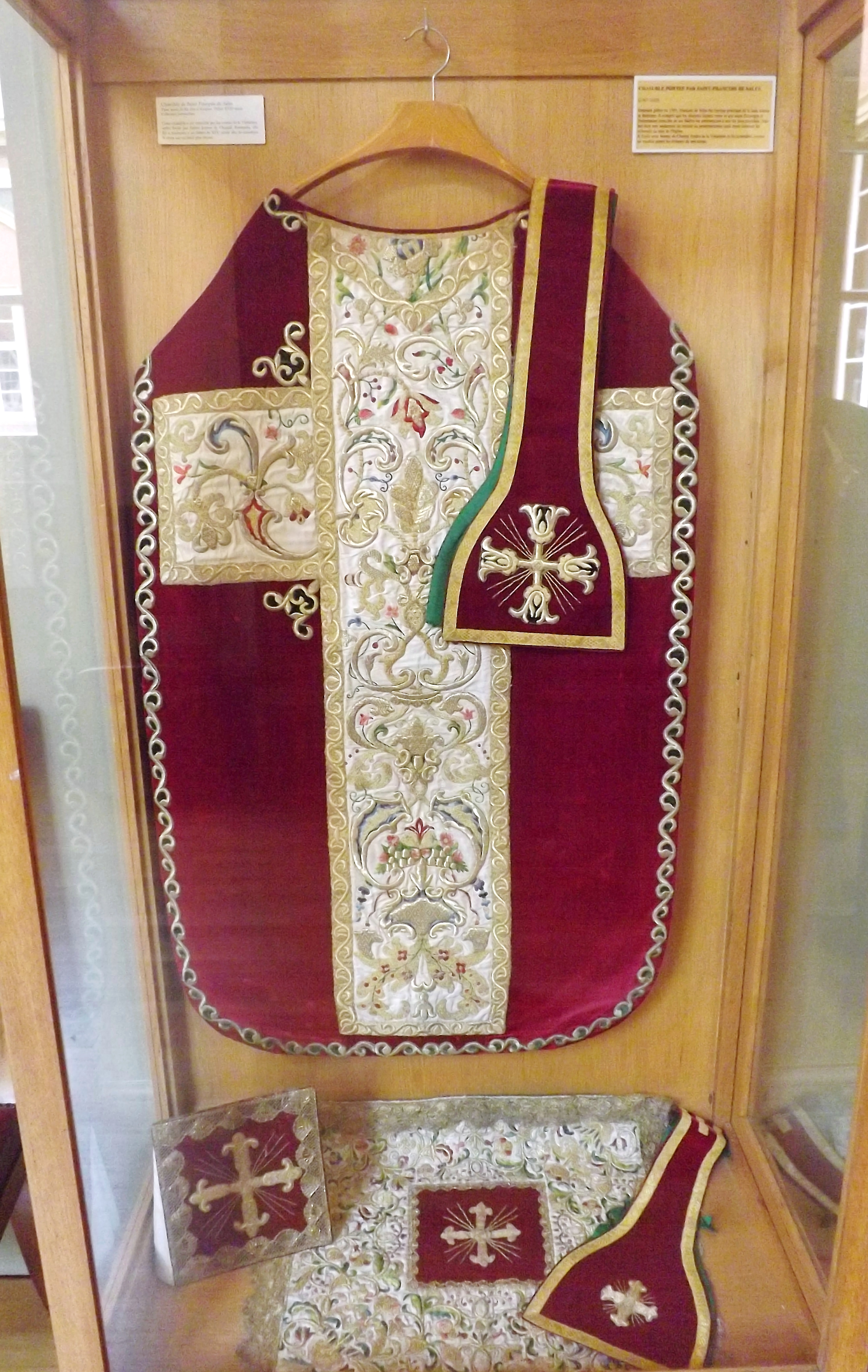
Chasuble de Francis de Sales.

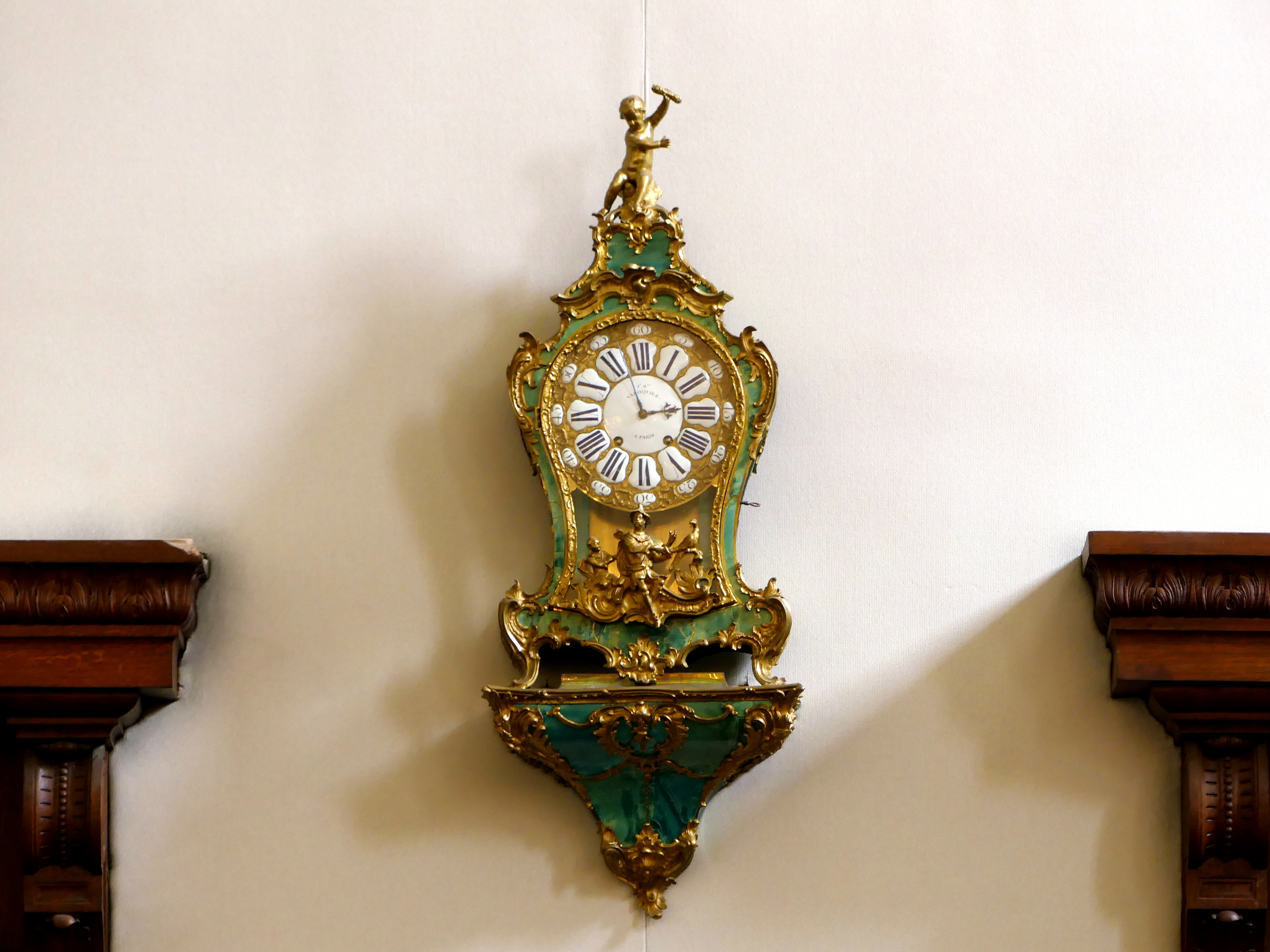
Cartel and console for the wall clock.

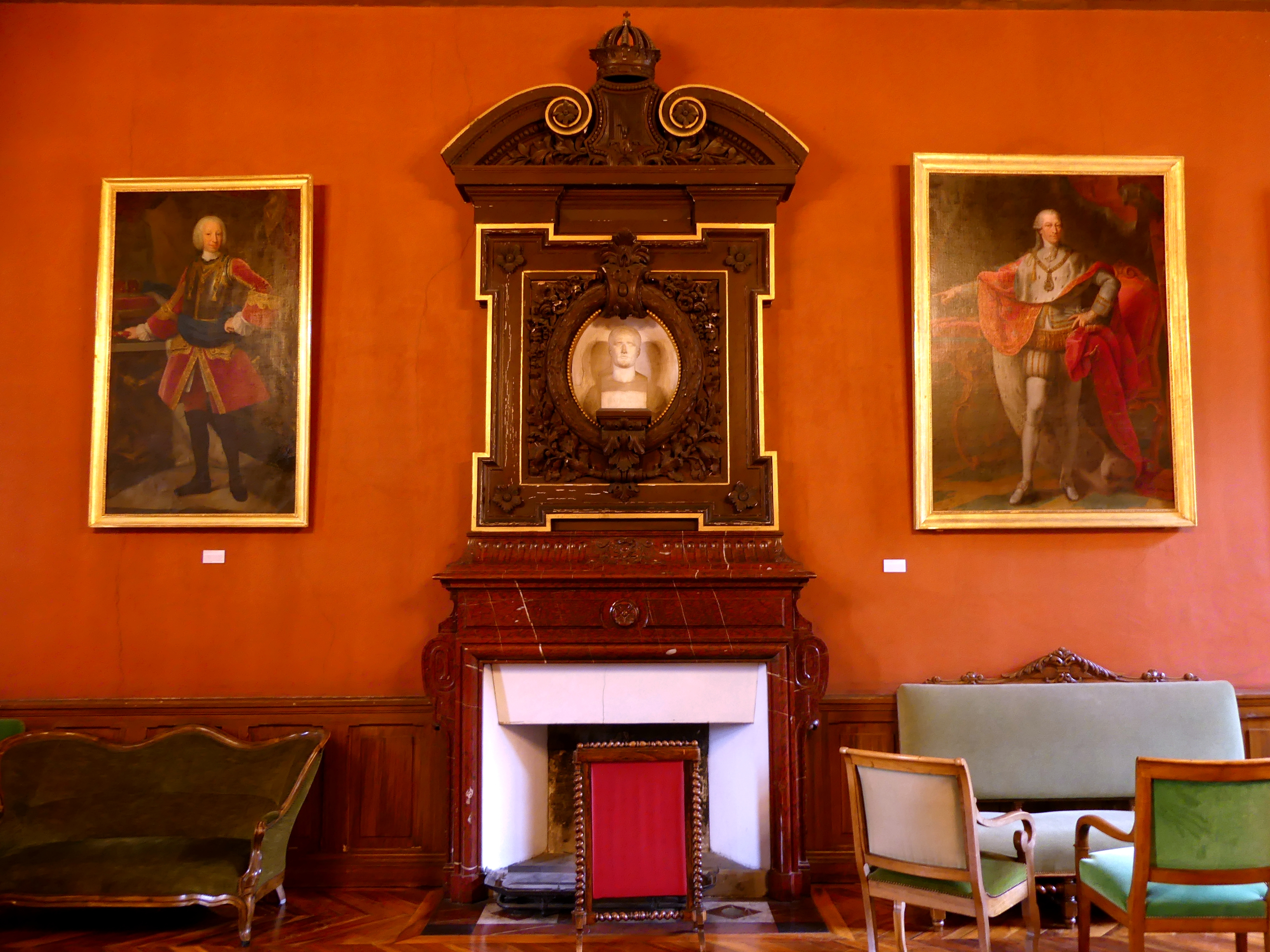
La Clementina paintings of the sovereigns of Savoy.

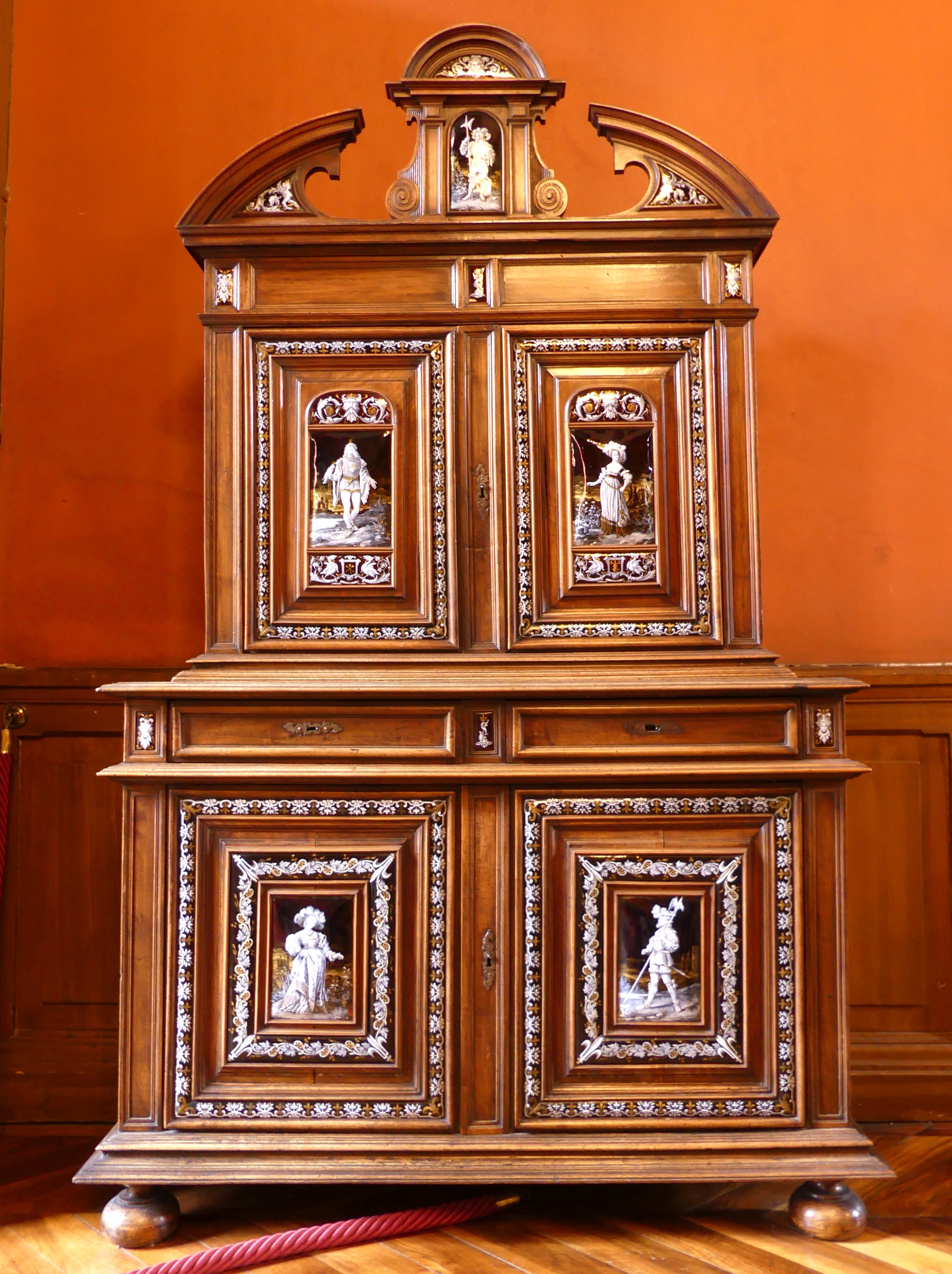
Double cabinet with enamel decoration 1.

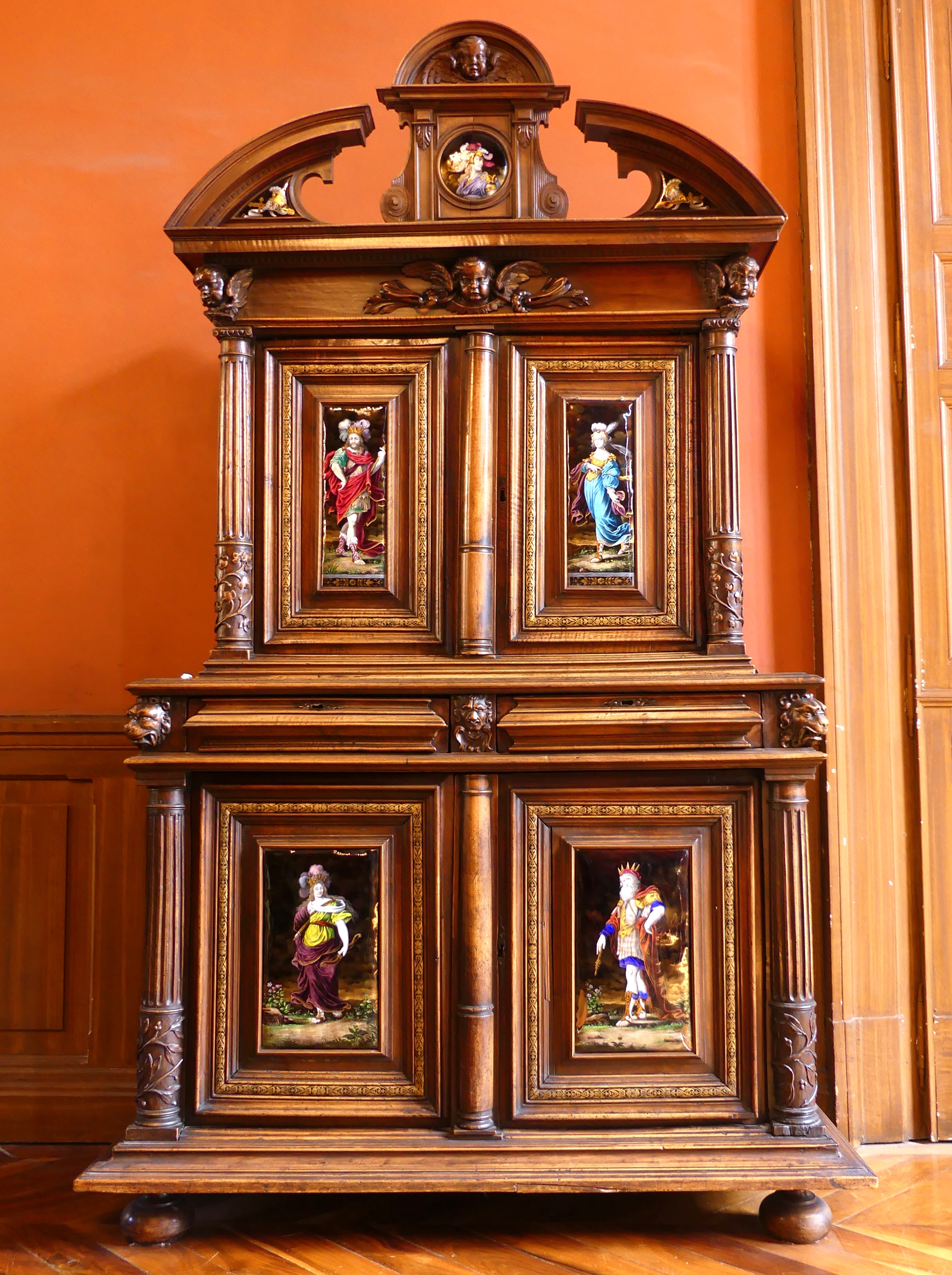
Double cabinet with enamel decoration 2.

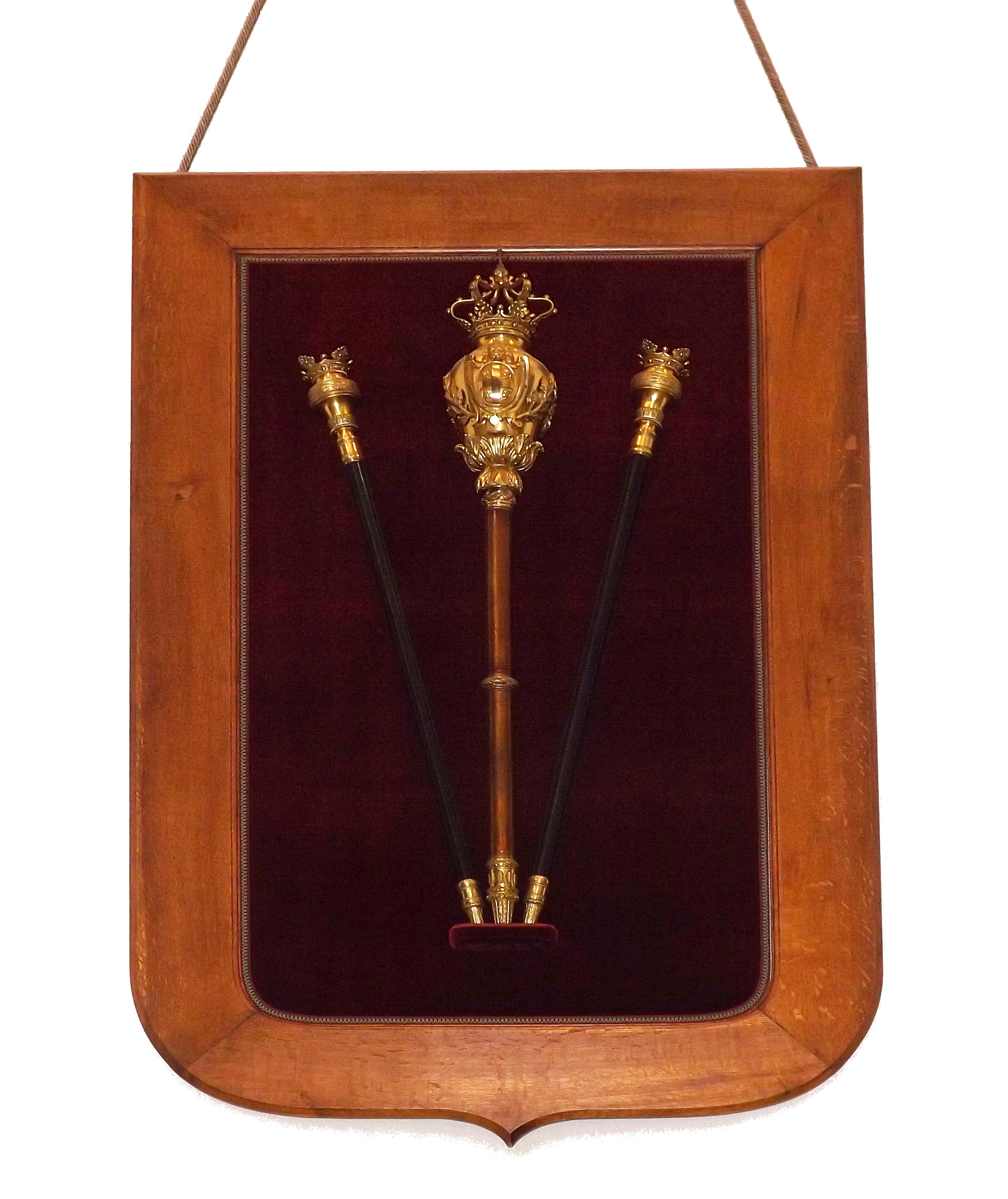
Mace and chopsticks from the Senate of Savoie.

== See also ==
- Court of Appeal of Chambéry

== Bibliography ==
- Guillot, Denis (1971). "Petite histoire parmi la grande... Le palais de justice de Chambéry" [A little history among the big ones... The Chambéry courthouse]. Bulletin de la Société des Amis du Vieux Chambéry (in French). III: 41–46.
- Viout, Jean-Olivier (1989). Le palais de justice de Chambéry [Chambéry courthouse] (in French). Éd. Tribunal de commerce de Chambéry.
- Juttet, François; Guides-conférenciers de Chambéry (2005). Chambéry : Lecture d'une ville [Chambéry: Reading a city] (in French). Comp'Act. pp. 231–234. ISBN 2-87661-374-3.
