= Omlet =

Omlet may be:

- A misspelling of omelette, an egg dish
- Omlet (2005), a Welsh novel by Nia Medi
- Omlet, a thoroughbred horse who won the 1932 Grande Prêmio Protetora do Turfe in Brazil
- Omlet Chat, a chat program included in the Asus Zen UI for Android phones and tablets
- Omlet Ltd, a British company that manufactures the Eglu chicken coop
