= Rent a Coop =

- Industry: Chickens
- Founded: 2012
- Founder: Diana and Tyler Phillips
- Headquarters: Plano, Texas, United States
- Area served: Worldwide
- Products: Chickens, Chicken Supplies
- Website: https://rentacoop.com

RentACoop is a Maryland-based international business that designs, manufactures, and sells proprietary products for backyard chickens and chickens as pets.

Additionally, the Company provides chicken coop rentals in the Washington, D.C., and New York City Metro regions. The company was founded in Potomac, Maryland, United States. It is private company owned by Surge Private Equity, headquartered in Plano, Texas.

== History ==
Tyler Phillips and Diana Samata started the business in Potomac, Maryland, in early 2012 with less than $50 by using salvaged wood, hinges and relatives' tools to make their first chicken coop selling them on Craigs List. Phillips and Samata opened their second location in Flemington, New Jersey, in 2014. In June 2014, the business had 70 chicken coops and incubators on rent with customers.

Tyler Phillips began to design proprietary chicken feeders and waterers to reduce the manual labor involved in maintaining the chicken coops the company rented. RentACoop began manufacturing its own line of chicken feeders and waterers and selling them directly to chicken owners in 2014. Beginning in 2015, RentACoop's primary business has been direct-to-consumer sales of chicken coop supplies.

In 2017, RentACoop added Amazon as a distribution channel.

In 2018, the company changed its name from Rent a Coop to RentACoop.

On February 1, 2021, Surge Private Equity acquired a large portion of RentACoop.

== Products ==
RentACoop sells more than 100 proprietary products that are primarily designed for use in chicken coops in residential settings. Its most popular product is the red auto-fill cup for chicken waterers.

In 2022, the company launched the sub-brand Barn Appetit, expanding into the category of healthy chicken feed starting with dried black soldier fly larvae.

== Services ==
RentACoop maintains its chicken coop rental business in the locations of Flemington, New Jersey, and Germantown, Maryland, with optional local delivery. RentACoop's rental services has included three offerings: chicken rental, chick rental, and an egg hatching program.

== See also ==
- Rent the Chicken
