= Stockyard =

A stockyard in mineral storage is a designated area for receiving, storing, blending, and reclaiming bulk mineral materials. These facilities are critical for managing the flow of raw materials in industries such as mining, metallurgy, and port operations.

Stockyard or Stockyards may also refer to:

== Places ==
- Stockyard, Queensland, Australia, locality in the Shire of Livingstone
- Stockyard Landing, original name of Arabi, Louisiana
- Stockyards, California, former town
- Stockyards, nickname for the northwest quadrant of The Junction, Toronto, Ontario, Canada
- Fort Worth Stockyards, a historic district in Fort Worth, Texas

== Other uses ==
- A feedlot or other gathering point for livestock, especially cattle
- STOCKYARD Magazine, a Chicago-based publication
- Stockyard, amateur baseball team in the Boston Park League, Massachusetts, United States

== See also ==
- Meat packing industry
- Union Stock Yards
- Yard (disambiguation)
