= Shipyard (disambiguation) =

A shipyard is a place where ships are built and repaired.

Shipyard or Ship Yard may also refer to:

- Ship Yard, a rail yard in Richmond, Virginia
- Shipyard, Belize, a village in the Orange Walk District of Belize
- Shipyard Brewing Company, an American microbrewery and soft drink manufacturer
- Shipyard Railway, a rail line in Richmond, California, in use during World War II
- Yard (sailing), a spar on the mast of a sailing ship

== See also ==
- Ship (disambiguation)
- Yard (disambiguation)
