= Rent The Chicken =

US-based chicken rental company

Rent the Chicken
- Industry: Chickens
- Founded: 2013
- Founders: Phil & Jenn
- Headquarters: Freeport, Pennsylvania, United States
- Area served: Worldwide
- Products: Chickens, Incubators
- Website: rentthechicken.com

Rent The Chicken is an American multinational company headquartered in Freeport, Pennsylvania, that rents chickens and incubators. As of May 2021, Rent The Chicken is the largest chicken rental company in the world. The company works with farmers in more than 30 US states and 3 Canadian provinces. It was founded on September 1, 2013, by Phil and Jenn Tompkins with the mission of "Families helping Families".

== Media reaction ==
Various media outlets have interviewed the business throughout the years. Articles include "Curious about raising chickens? This company lets you rent hens for your backyard" from today.com and other outlets such as CHEK News Canada, Pittsburgh Post-Gazette, HuffPost, The New York Times, New York Post, GlobalNews.ca, Daily Mail, and ABC 7 Chicago Localish.

== Affiliate Program ==
Rent The Chicken operates on a distributed affiliate model, partnering with local farmers, homesteaders, and small enterprises throughout the United States and Canada to deliver its seasonal chicken rental services. As part of the business model, each affiliate receives territorial exclusivity, with a negotiated area (usually a 50-mile radius), ensuring each partner serves a defined local market without competing with other affiliates.

Affiliates are responsible for sourcing or raising hens, building or procuring portable coops, and fulfilling customer deliveries, pickup, and support for the duration of each rental season. Rent The Chicken provides business training, centralized marketing, administrative resources such as contracts and digital documentation, and ongoing operational assistance.

Since its founding in 2013, Rent The Chicken has grown to more than 45 affiliates across the U.S. and Canada, serving dozens of local markets.

== See also ==
- Rent a Coop
