= Yard (land) =

Land adjacent to buildings

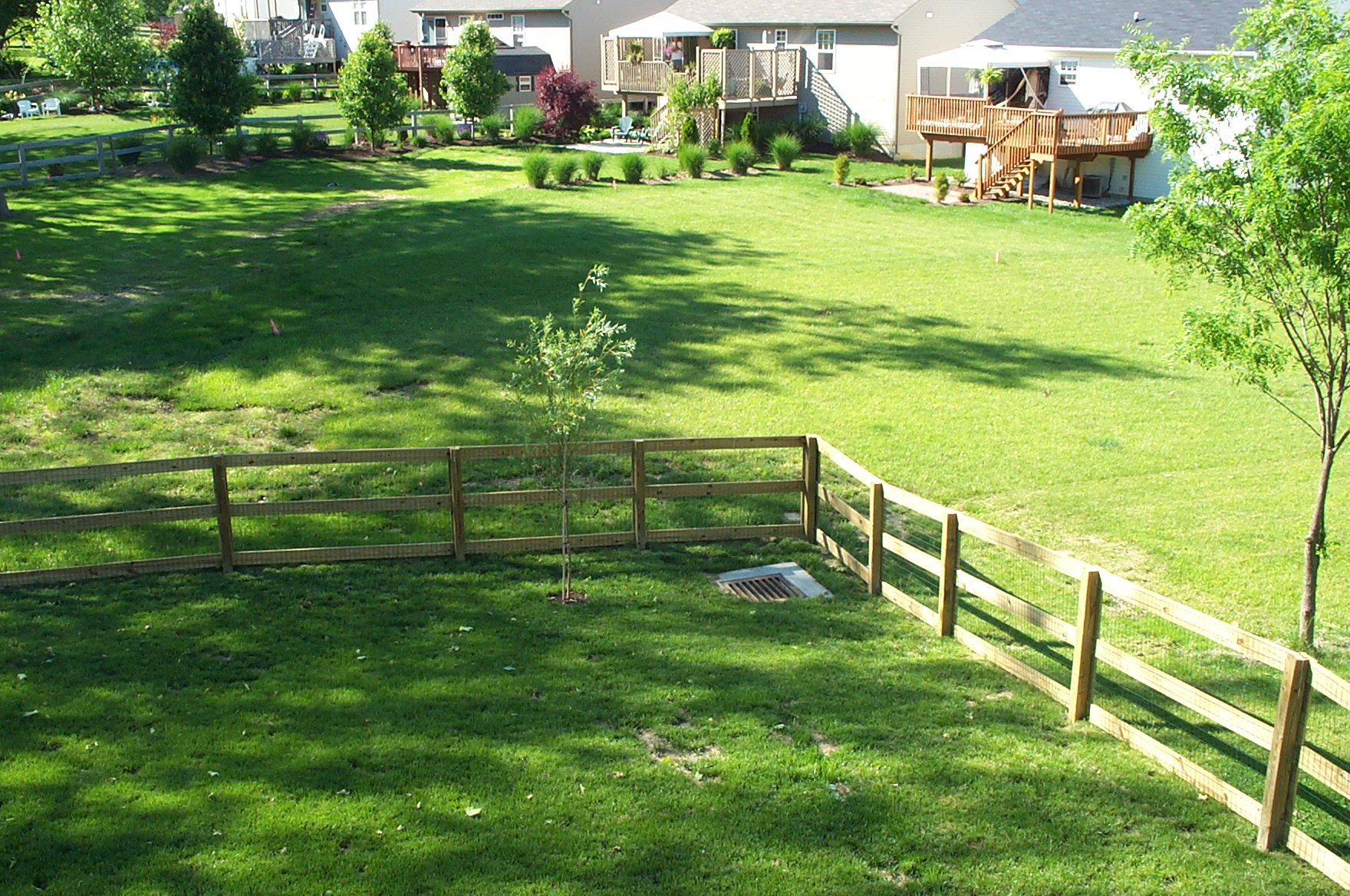
A subdivision backyard (American English)

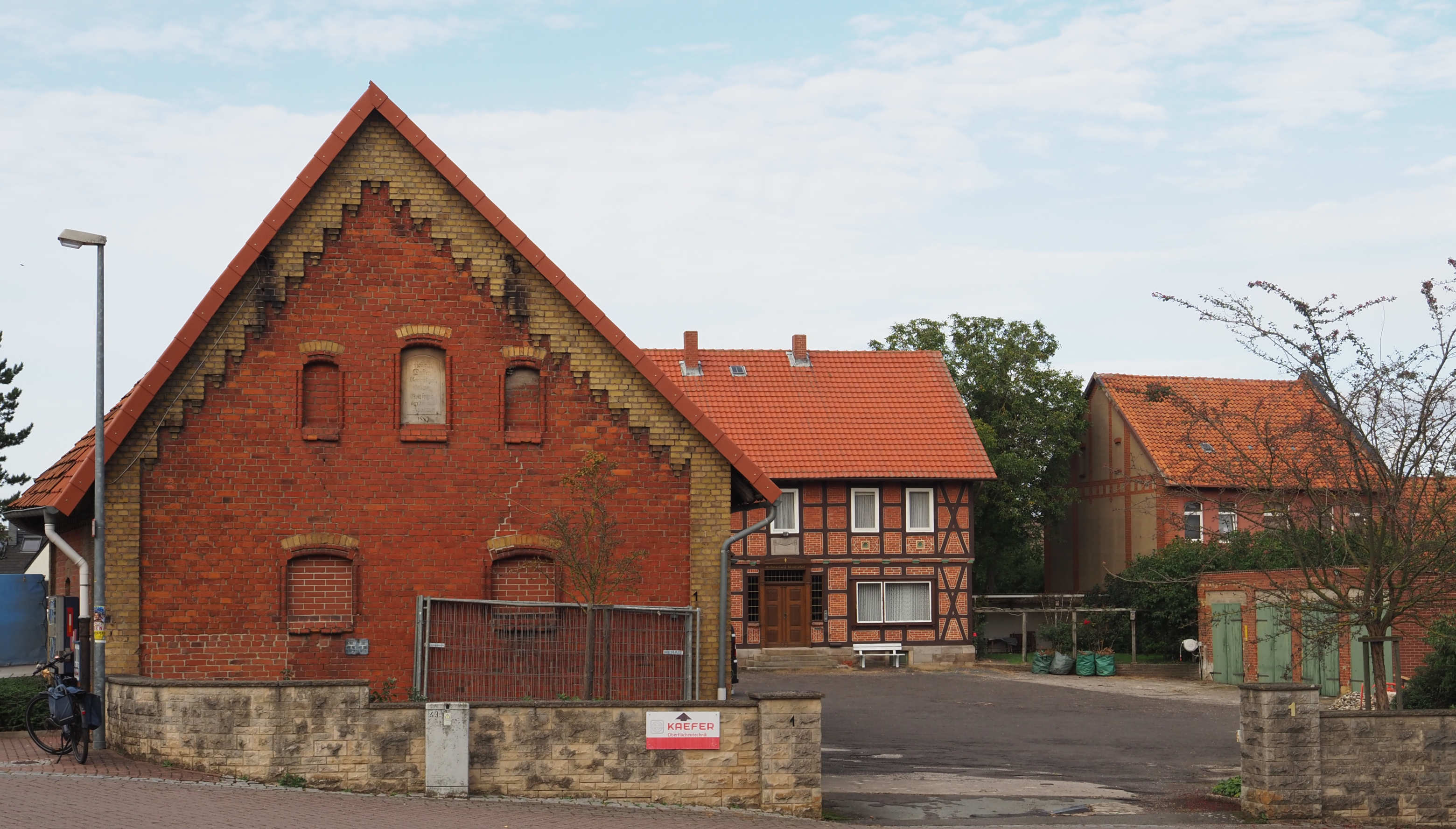
A yard in a rural town in Germany (Hildesheim Börde)

A yard is an area of land immediately adjacent to one or more buildings. It may be either enclosed or open. The word may come from the same linguistic root as the word garden (Proto-Indo-European gher "to grasp, enclose") and has many of the same meanings.

A number of derived words exist, usually tied to a particular usage or building type. Some may be archaic or in lesser use now. Examples of such words are: courtyard, barnyard, hopyard, graveyard, churchyard, brickyard, prison yard, railyard, junkyard, stableyard, and dooryard.

== Etymology ==
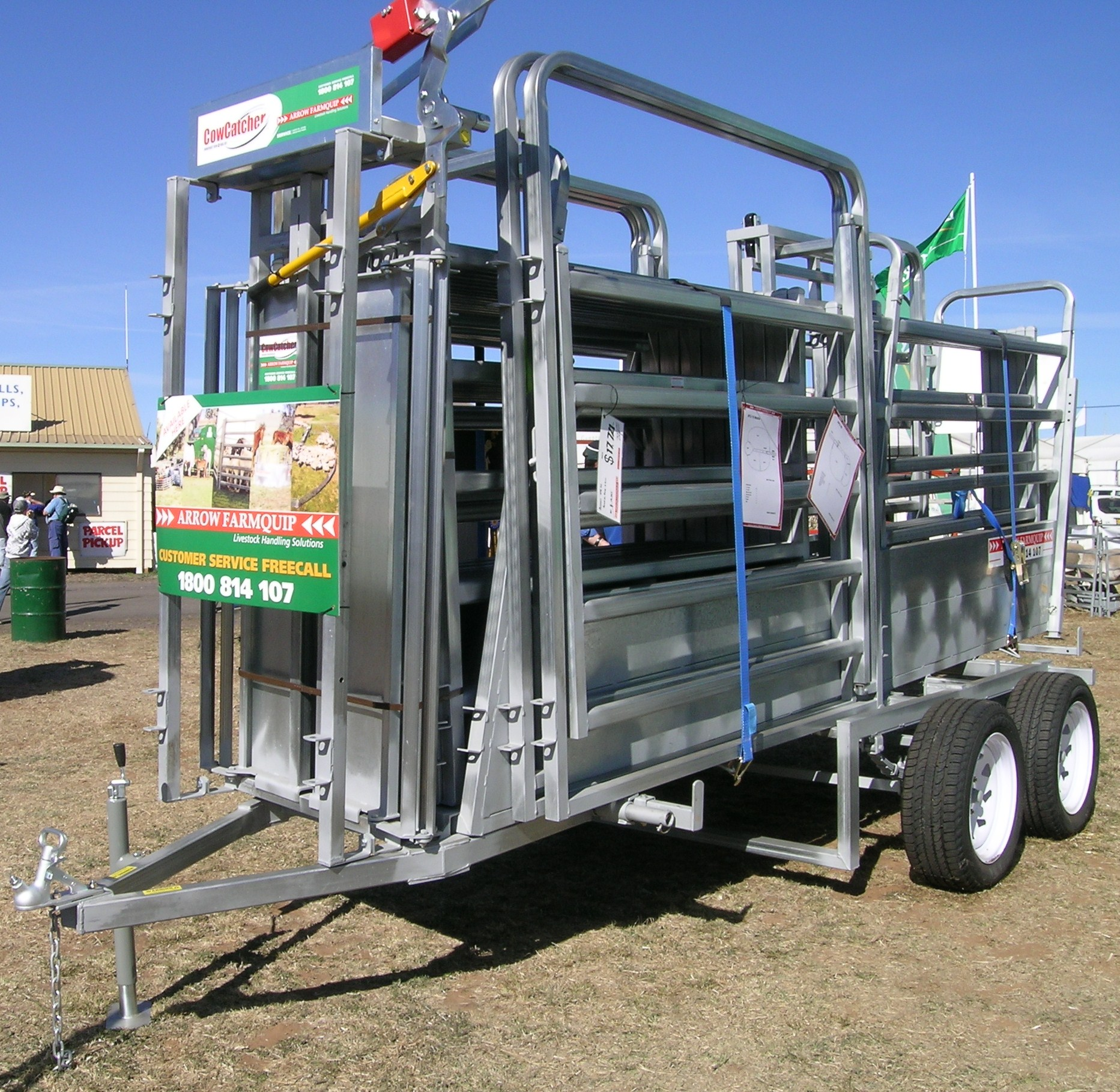
Portable cattle yards

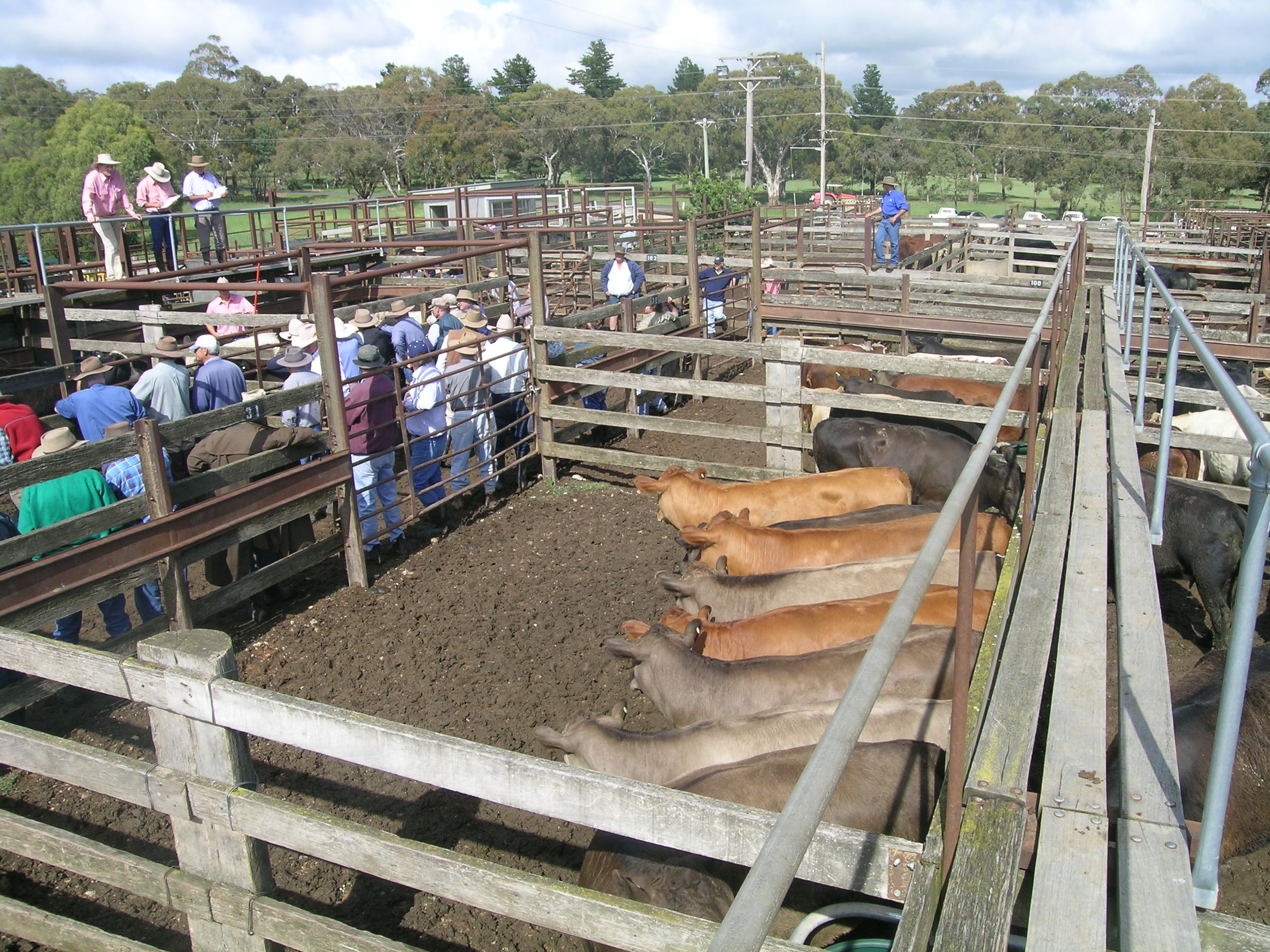
Grass-fed cattle, saleyards, Walcha, New South Wales

One possible account of the origin is the Middle English yerd, going back to Old English geard "fence, enclosure, dwelling, home, district, country," going back to Germanic *garđa- (whence also Old Saxon gard "garden, (compare the Frenchjardin) dwelling, world," Middle Dutch gaert "garden, yard," Old High German gart "enclosure, circle, enclosed piece of property," Old Norse garðr "enclosure, courtyard," Gothic gards (i-stem) "house, household, courtyard"; from an n-stem *garđan-: Old Frisian garda "family property, courtyard," Old Saxon gardo "garden," Old High German garto), perhaps (if from *ghortós) going back to Indo-European *ghortos "enclosure," whence also Old Irish gort "arable or pasture field," Welsh garth "field, enclosure, fold," Breton garz "hedge," Latin hortus "garden," Greek chórtos "farm-yard", "feeding-place", "fodder", (from which "hay" originally as grown in an enclosed field). "Girdle," and "court" may be other related words from the same root.

In areas where farming is an important part of life, a yard is also a piece of enclosed land for farm animals or other agricultural purposes, often referred to as a cattleyard, sheepyard, stockyard, etc. In Australia, portable or mobile yards are sets of transportable steel panels used to build temporary stockyards.

== Application of the term ==
In North America and Australasia today, a yard can be any part of a property surrounding or associated with a house or other residential structure, usually (although not necessarily) separate from a garden (where plant maintenance is more formalized). A yard will typically consist mostly of lawn or play area. The yard in front of a house is referred to as a front yard, the area at the rear is known as a backyard. Backyards are generally more private and are thus a more common location for recreation. Yard size varies with population density. In urban centers, many houses have very small or even no yards at all. In the suburbs, yards are generally much larger and have room for such amenities as a patio, a playplace for children, a basketball court or a swimming pool.

In British English, these areas would usually be described as a garden, similarly subdivided into a front garden and a back garden. The term yard is reserved for a hard surfaced area usually enclosed or at least with limited access. In modern Britain, the term yard is also used for land adjacent to or amongst workplace buildings or for commercial premises, for example timberyard, boatyard or dockyard.

In North America, the term "garden" refers only to the area that contains plots of vegetables, herbs, flowers, and/or ornamental plants; and the term "yard" does not refer to this "garden", as "yard" is typically meant to describe a grass lawn; although the flower garden or vegetable garden may be within a yard.

== See also ==
- Curtilage
- Pen (enclosure), an enclosure for domestic animals
- Scotland Yard, the location of police headquarters in London
- Terrestrial ecoregion
- Yard (disambiguation)
- Yardbird, American slang with several meanings
- Junkyard, a place that holds scrap and parts from old machines or vehicles.
