= Court of Appeal of Chambéry =

French court

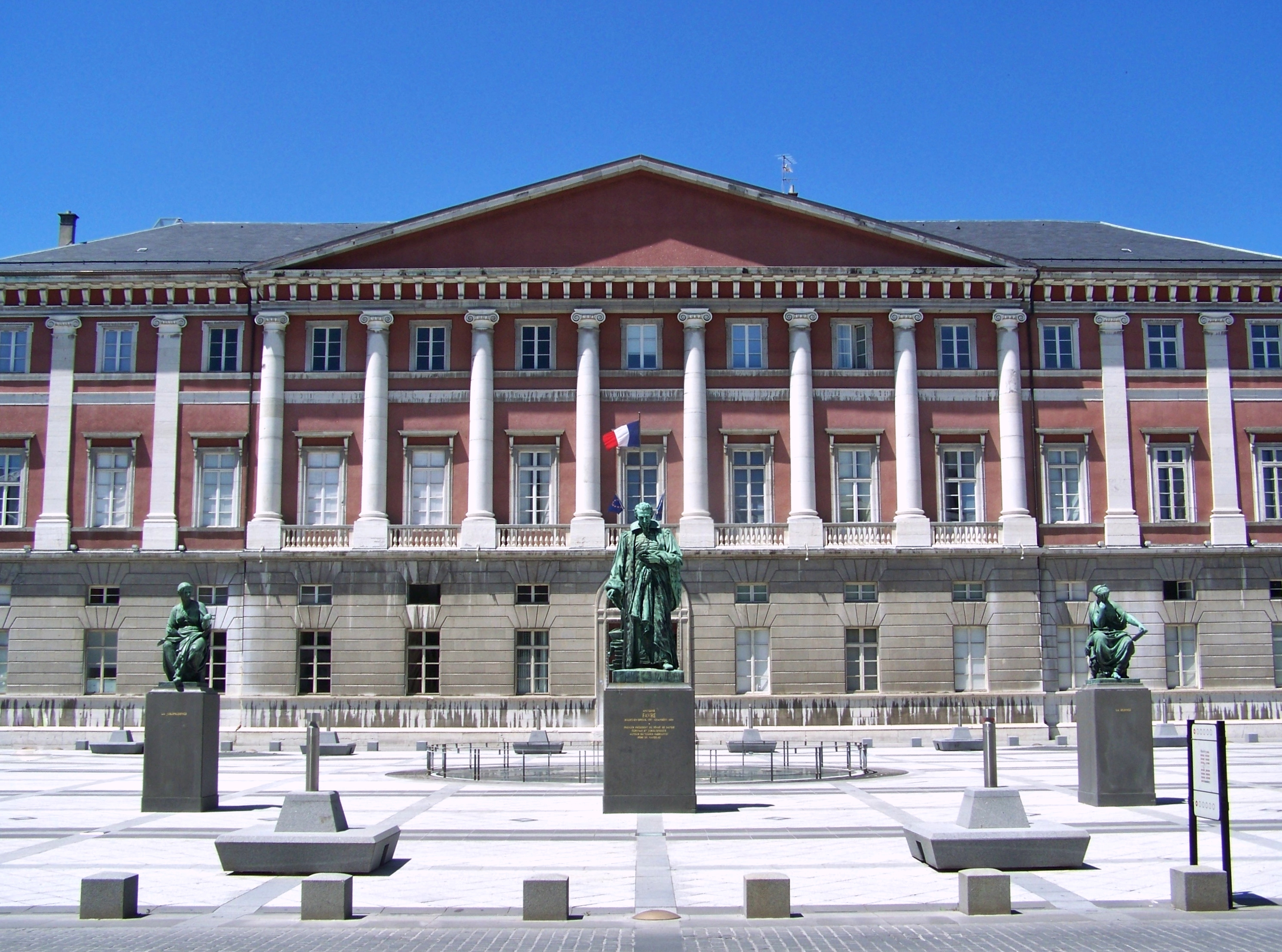
- Established: 1848
- Location: France

The Court of Appeal of Chambéry is a French court based in the capital of the Savoie department. It hears cases heard by the courts within its jurisdiction, which covers the departments of Savoie and Haute-Savoie.

== Headquarters ==
The court sits in the Chambéry courthouse, a vast quadrilateral between the Place du Palais de Justice and the Parc du Verney, built between 1850 and 1860 in a neo-classical style. The building also houses other courts, such as the tribunal de grande instance.

== History ==
In 1848, the Senate of Savoie, whose origins date back to 1329, became a court of appeal, which was retained in the imperial judicial organization when Savoie was annexed to France in 1860. The maintenance of this court was linked to the conditions for the annexation of Savoie laid down in the agreements appended to the Treaty of Turin.

On April 29, 1860, the Court of Appeal proclaimed the results of a plebiscite in which 130,533 Savoyards voted against 235 in favor of reuniting the former Duchy of Savoie with Imperial France. On June 23, a law was passed, article 3 of which stipulated that “the departments of Savoie and Haute-Savoie form the jurisdiction of a court of appeal, with its headquarters in Chambéry”.

The operation of the new imperial court was more or less the same as that which had been set up under the Sardinian government of 1848. On appeal, it judged cases handled by the eight courts of first instance, those of Chambéry, Albertville, Moûtiers, and Saint-Jean-de-Maurienne for Savoie, and those of Annecy, Bonneville, Saint-Julien-en-Genevois and Thonon for Haute-Savoie. Only the office of the Poor Lawyer, instituted by Duke Amédée VIII in 1477, was abolished.

Joseph-Louis-Thomas Girod, President of the Court of Appeal since 1859, remained in his post after the Annexation. The transition from the Sardinian to the new French regime was not a smooth one, and tensions arose. In 1864, the court's lawyers went on strike for several weeks. Since Savoie's reunion with France, the court of appeal has been called into question in 1870, 1882, 1901, 1920, and 2007, following various reforms of the judicial map. On each of these occasions, local elected representatives (Chambéry town council, deputies, and senators), lawyers, and the public prosecutor appealed to the inviolability of the 1860 Treaty of Turin, validated by the plebiscite, on the existence of this institution.

== Local courts ==
| - | 5 judicial courts | 6 district courts | 3 labor courts | 3 commercial courts |
|---|---|---|---|---|
| Savoie | Albertville; Chambéry | Albertville; Chambéry | Chambéry | Chambéry |
| Haute-Savoie | Annecy; Bonneville; Thonon-les-Bains | Annecy; Annemasse; Bonneville; Thonon-les-Bains | Annecy; Thonon-les-Bains | Annecy; Thonon-les-Bains |

== First presidents ==
| 1859-1866 | Joseph-Louis-Thomas Girod |
| 1866- | Amédée Greyfié de Bellecombe |
| ... | |
| 1906-1912 | Albin Curet |
| ... | |
| 1938- | Eugène Penancier |
| 1943 | René Dallant |
| ... | |
| 1950-1957 | René Dallant |
| ... | |
| 2005-2008 | Dominique Charvet |
| 2008-2015 | Jean-Yves Mc Kee |
| 2015- | Michel Allaix |

== See also ==
- Chambéry Courthouse

== Bibliography ==
- Guillot, Guillot (1966). Le statut particulier de la Cour d'appel de Chambéry (in French). Les Cahiers de Savoie.
- Descostes, François (1901). Comité de défense des droits acquis de la Savoie. L'Annexion de 1860 et la cour d'appel de Chambéry. Rapport de M. François Descostes, au nom de la commission d'études. Mémoire au Gouvernement et aux Chambres (in French). F. Gentil.
