= Urban chicken keeping =

Type of urban agriculture

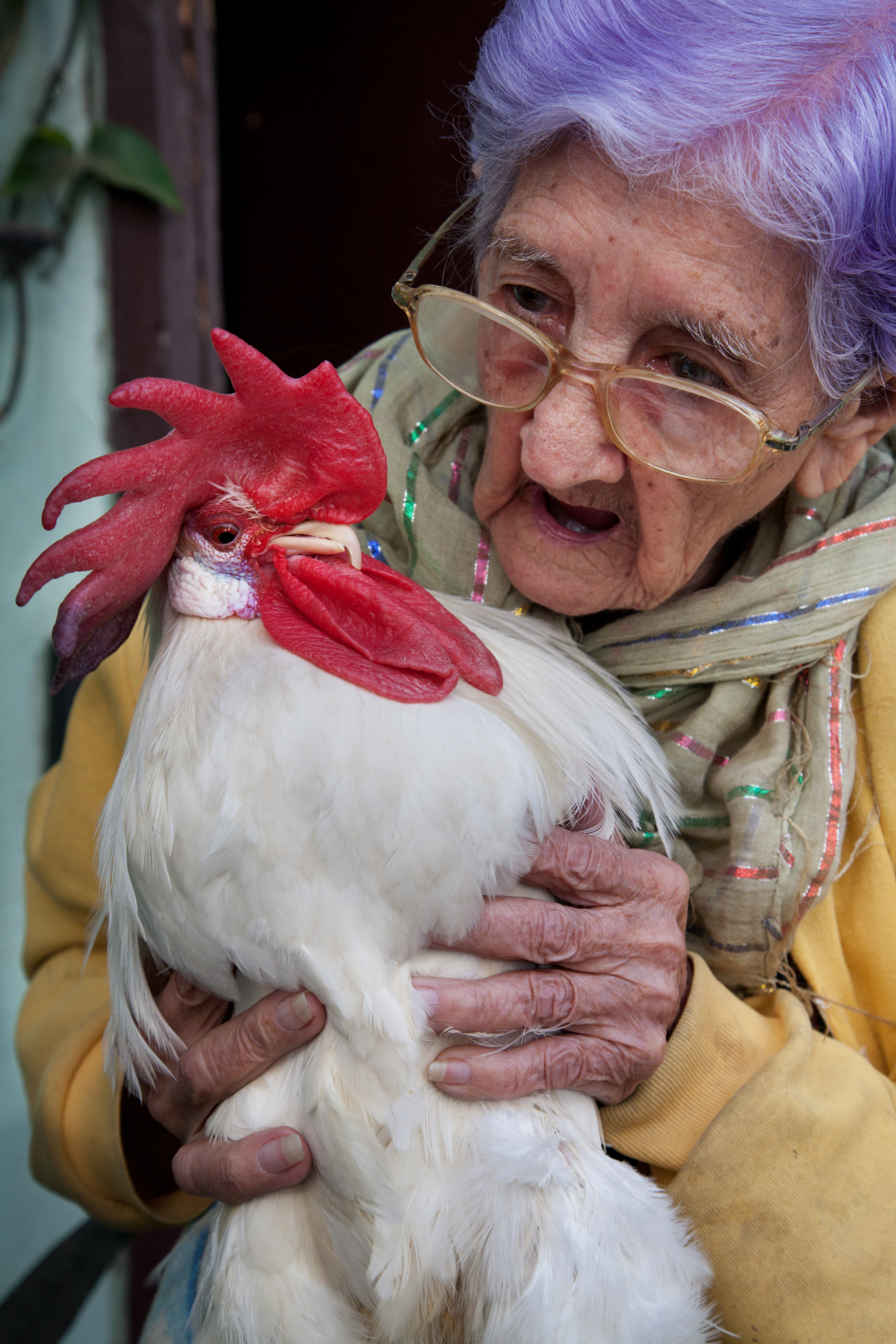
Woman with her pet rooster. Havana, Cuba

Urban keeping of chickens as pets, for eggs, meat, or for eating pests is popular in urban and suburban areas. Some people sell the eggs for side income.

Keeping chickens in an urban environment is a type of urban agriculture, important in the local food movement, which is the growing practice of cultivating, processing and distributing food in or around a village, town or city. According to National Sustainable Agriculture Information Service and experts in backyard agriculture, there are a host of personal benefits associated with urban agriculture and keeping chickens in one's own backyard.

Those caring for chickens as pets may not have the expectation of eggs; some may even feed their hens' eggs back to them or even hormonally implant their hens to prevent egg-laying, which is purported to offer welfare benefits for the hens. Those caring for chickens as pets may also have experience caring for disabled chickens and/or indoor chickens.

== History ==
Keeping livestock in cities has been common throughout history and is still practiced in many parts of the world. For example, 50,000 pigs were being kept in Manhattan in 1859. Local ordinances were eventually created to limit this, however, owing to the noise and smell nuisance. These ordinances were relaxed only in times of war when the urban populace was encouraged to provide food for itself.

Urban relief gardens played an important role in sustaining large populations of Americans during economic depressions. War gardens played an important role in the nationwide effort to help win both World War I and World War II. Backyard chickens have become a common practice in the United States. These victory gardens made gardening a patriotic activity and introduced gardening as an activity for everyone, not just those too poor to buy their own food. Later, in the late 1960s and 1970s, community gardening started to make a comeback as a hobby. Organic gardening, urban animal husbandry, and community farms became popular and many cities around the country started community gardening programs for their residents.

== Revival ==
In Canada and the United States, the raising of chickens on urban, suburban, and small town residential lots has become increasingly popular. For example, in Madison, Wisconsin, citizens formed a group called the Chicken Underground, overturned a ban upon domestic chickens and there are now 81 registered owners. A film titled Mad City Chickens was made about their campaign. More and more cities that had previously banned urban chickens are removing old regulations or making permits easier to obtain.

Policies toward keeping chickens vary by country or city. Other cities with urban chicken programs and activists include Halifax, New York City, Portland, Oregon, Seattle and Vancouver.

In the UK, the keeping of chickens has also grown in popularity with as many as 200,000 households involved. Sales of the Eglu hen house increased ten-fold between 2004 and 2009.

== Commercial vs. backyard egg production ==
Commercial egg production has been associated with salmonella and other disease outbreaks in the United States. Poor sanitation and crowded hen houses have contributed to these problems. Expansion of the poultry industry, fueled by an increased demand for poultry products, has created a demand for high throughput poultry and egg production. The resulting increased poultry population density and the rearing of incompatible poultry species in close proximity have presented major disease challenges. These disease risks still exist with backyard meat and egg production and may be amplified by the more open nature of backyard chicken coops. Biosecurity measures implemented at commercial farms can be less effective when applied to chickens that spend time outdoors with direct interactions with wildlife, which can be vectors for salmonella. Additionally, soil and water contaminated by free range chickens infected with salmonella pose a risk of perpetual infection of other birds due to the difficulty of disinfection. Historically, avian infectious diseases were not appreciated for their ability to influence populations and were relatively neglected for their part in causing species declines. Another Study in California found that Dioxin levels were significantly increased in chickens raised in soil contaminated by a nearby wood treatment plant when compared to traditional caged chickens from the same area.

According to Mench et al., although changes in commercial egg production systems are being driven largely by animal welfare concerns, it is clear that other aspects of such changes must be considered to ensure sustainable egg production. Sustainability is a complex topic. Elements of sustainability include economics, environmental effects, human health and safety, and social values in addition to animal welfare. Backyard egg production has been suggested as a solution to sustainable, healthy food supply for families.

== Breeds ==
While there are over 300 different breeds of chickens, most people choose between a select few breeds. Most chicken owners are looking for a high-producing egg layer, cold- and heat-hardy, docile, quiet, non-broody, and aesthetically pleasing chicken breed. Many commercial chickens raised in factories for white eggs are white leghorns. This breed is noisy, but has a very high production of eggs and rarely go broody, and they are not very docile, cold-hardy or aesthetically pleasing. Urban chicken owners often choose a red-sex link hybrid similar to production brown-egg producers (Isa Browns, HyLine Browns), another hybrid among the Red and Black Sex-links, or chickens known as "heritage breeds," including the Rhode Island Red, Barred Rocks, Buff Orpingtons, Brahmas, Wyandottes, etc. These breeds generally fit more of the categories that urban chicken owners are looking for.

Meat chickens are different than egg-laying chickens for urban chicken owners. Chicks sold specifically as meat chickens are sometimes called broiler chickens. As with egg-laying breeds, there is a variety of meat chicken breeds. These chickens are butcher-ready in a short time period after hatching. Some breeds grow to full size in as little as 5 weeks. Other breeds grow for up to 12–14 weeks until the butcher date. Meat chickens provide urban chicken owners the ability to know where their meat is coming from, and how it was raised.

Egg-laying chickens include the two groups, Bantams and Standards. Often raised as pets, Bantams are the smaller variety of chickens that require less space and feed. These smaller chickens provide smaller eggs, but still produce a large quantity of eggs. Standards range from heavy to light breeds and produce the average sized eggs.

== Concerns ==
There are some common concerns associated with the practice of raising chickens in residential areas, specifically noise, odor, attraction of predators/pests, property values, and health. Municipalities have different restrictions on the keeping of backyard flocks, but are generally trending towards a more permissive attitude.

=== Health ===
Bird flu and salmonella are the two biggest concerns to human health. Avian influenza is a significant risk in backyard flocks because of their exposure to wild birds that can easily pass the disease to the flock. Avian influenza can be contracted through inhalation or exposure to the virus through the eyes, nose or mouth. The risk for catching bird flu is low, according to Mark Slifka, Ph. D. Infectious Disease Expert with Oregon Health & Science University in Portland, OR. He states this is especially true if the hens are kept in a closed environment, since they wouldn't be exposed to other birds. However, this risk increases when measures to keep chickens separate from human contact are not observed.

Salmonella is another significant health concern among backyard flocks. Salmonella can infect humans when they consume contaminated poultry products and has become a major public health risk globally, which is worsening due to the shift in consumer desires towards cage free and unprocessed foods. 45 outbreaks of salmonella in the United States between 1996 and 2012 have been linked to mail-order hatcheries commonly used by backyard chicken keepers. Further efforts and the coordination of veterinary experts, mail order hatcheries, and backyard farmers themselves are needed to address these risks.

Additionally, backyard egg production has been linked to increased exposure of chickens to chemicals and heavy metals. A backyard flock in Belgium was found after testing to contain high concentrations of lead, mercury, cobalt, and thallium in their eggs, which was attributed to soil contamination with these metals. Lead poisoning was found in 13 different backyard flocks in California, associated with lead exposure from soil, buildings, and bedding. In 2014, eggs submitted for testing from a backyard flock were found to have high enough concentrations of lead within the yolk and white to pose a potential public health risk. Active management of backyard flocks to remove them from this contamination, and soil cleaning efforts are necessary steps to eliminating this public health risk.

=== Noise ===
In some areas, roosters are banned, and only hens are allowed, and in limited numbers, to prevent problems with noise. Hens are relatively quiet as compared to pet dogs, though hens often vocalize after an egg is laid for a few minutes. The noise level during this squawking period has been measured at around 63 decibels, or about the level of two people talking. Other than post-laying squawking, normal hen sounds are not audible at 25 feet (7.6 m).

In Columbia, South Carolina it was argued that leaf blowers were far louder than chickens, that dogs produce more waste than chickens do, so neither of those concerns were a valid reason to keep a ban on them. However, the average chicken defecates upwards of seventy times a day, compared with a dog's two or three times a day, calling into question the veracity of that argument. In 1926 in Oakland, California, the department of public health and safety issued an order to "put your roosters in a light[-]proof coop, or device apparatus that will hold the rooster's head down so he can't crow" in response to complaints about the noise they were making.

=== Unwanted predators, pests, and rodents ===
Poultry are one of the main targets of wild carnivores. This attraction causes concern both for residents of the area and for the ecosystem in and surrounding the area, and have been at the heart of legislation aimed at requiring chicken owners to implement measures to protect poultry from predators. These interventions include having closed coops, with fencing that extends at least one foot into the ground, as well as fenced roofing for the chickens.

=== Property values ===
One of the arguments against allowing backyard hens is that chickens kept within city limits will cause a reduction in property values. This is due in part due to the adverse affects backyard chickens can cause; be it smell or noise.

== See also ==
- Urban agriculture
