= The Longest Yard =

The Longest Yard may refer to:

- The Longest Yard (1974 film), starring Burt Reynolds
- The Longest Yard (2005 film), remake of the 1974 film starring Adam Sandler and Chris Rock
- The Longest Yard (soundtrack), soundtrack for the 2005 remake.
