= Backyard =

Residential garden or other land behind a house

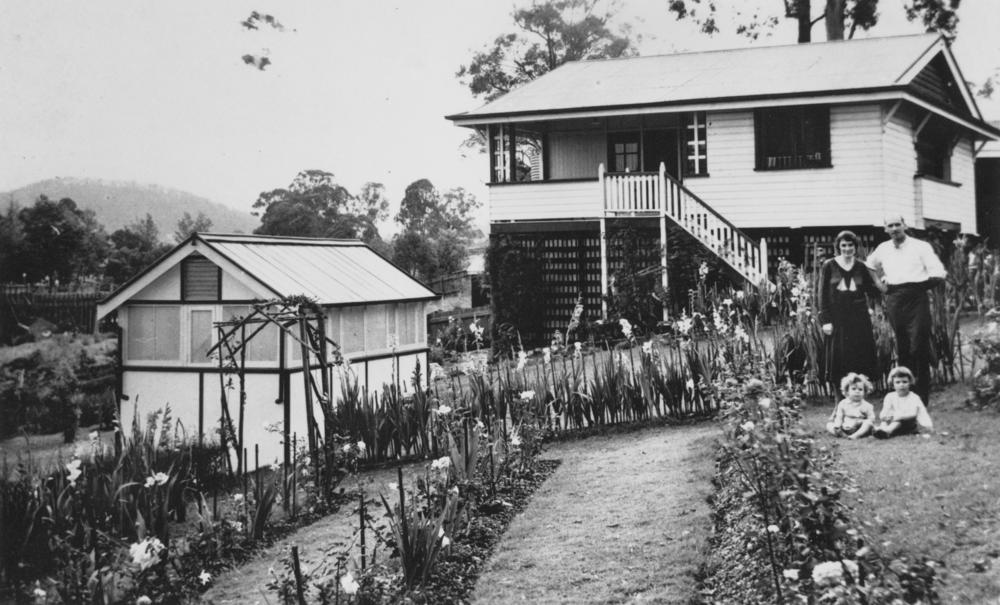
A back yard in Brisbane, Queensland, Australia, in 1929

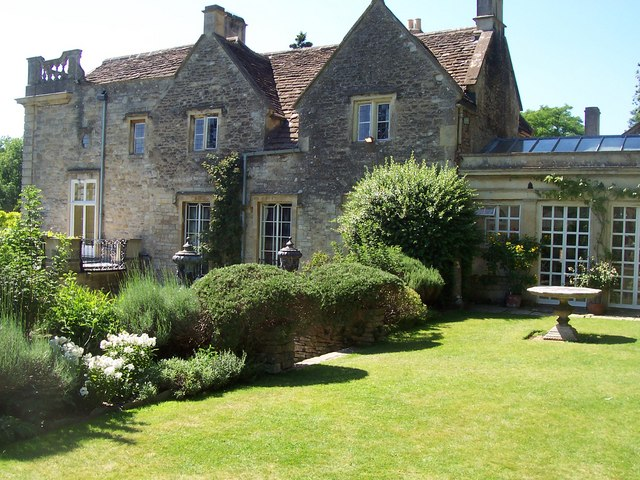
The back garden of Iford Manor was designed by Harold Peto.

A backyard, or back yard (known in the United Kingdom as a back garden or just garden), is a yard at the back of a house, common in suburban developments in the Western world.

It is typically a residential garden located at the rear of a property, on the other side of the house from the front yard. While Western gardens are almost universally based on plants, the "garden" (which etymologically may imply a shorthand of botanical garden) may use plants sparsely or not at all. Hence, the terms yard and garden are for the context of this article interchangeable in most cases.

== History ==
=== United Kingdom ===
In English suburban and gardening culture, back gardens have a special place. In Britain there are over 10 million back gardens. British planning require minimum distances between the rear faces of adjacent dwellings so there is usually space for a back garden of some sort. In other countries, such as Australia, this does not apply and preference for buildings with a large footprint has tended to squeeze out the space at the rear.

=== Australia ===
In Australia, until the mid-20th century, the back yard of a property would traditionally contain a fowl run, outhouse ("dunny"), vegetable patch, and woodheap. More recently, these have been replaced by outdoor entertainments such as a barbecue and swimming pool. But, since the 1990s, the trend in Australian suburban development has been for back yards to disappear as the dwellings now occupy almost all of the building plot.

In higher latitudes, it is economical in low land value regions to use open land surrounding a house for vegetable gardening during summers and allow sunlight to enter house windows from a low horizon angle during winters. As land value increases, houses are built nearer to each other. In order to preserve some of the open land, house owners may choose to allow construction on the side land of their houses, but not build in front of or behind their house in order to preserve some remnants of open surrounding land. The back area is known as the backyard or back garden.

== Usage ==
Because of weather constraints, it is usual to use a garden more in the summer than in the winter, although some usages are traditional, such as for a bonfire on Bonfire Night, 5 November. Similarly, daytime usage is more common than nighttime.

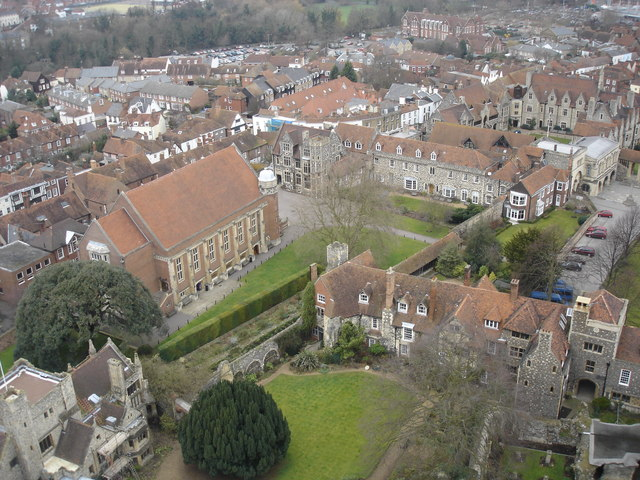
The back garden of the archdeacon of Canterbury contains a mulberry which is said to have been planted by Erasmus.

Functionally, it may be used for:

- Growing food
- Playing games
- Relaxing and sunbathing
- Raising plants
- Housing pets
- Drying clothes
- Making a compost heap
- Hobbies
- Locating a greenhouse, conservatory, shed, workshop, outhouse, or garage (if access to a road is possible)
- Partying
- Wildlife refuge
- Safe area for children
- Location of an air raid shelter such as the Anderson shelter of World War II

In fact, its functional and recreational use is so varied, that it cannot be easily categorised. Many of the freedoms of the use of the back garden come from the restrictions, social or legal of what are not done in the front.

Usually, clothes are not dried, vegetables are not grown, and sunbathing is not carried out in a front garden. All these can happen in the privacy of the back garden.

Traditionally, people treat a back garden as private to themselves, and not those they are neighbours to. The social etiquette of how one can greet and interact one's neighbours may be complex and defined by many informal social rules.

In some areas, talking to one's neighbours over the back wall (the side wall following the property boundary line) is usual, and is a welcome form of neighbourliness, while in other places it is not.

== Contents ==
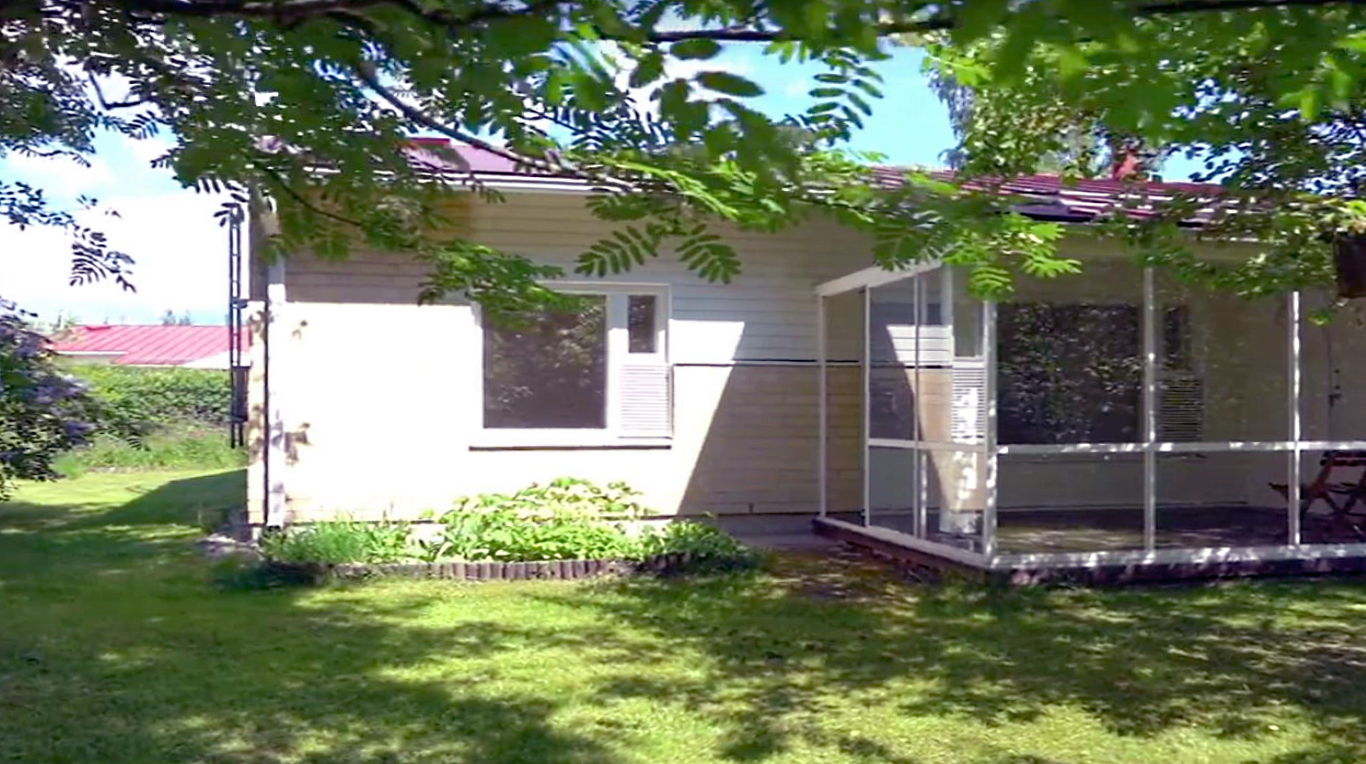
A backyard of house in Tampere, Finland

Depending on the size of the backyard, it may have any number of items (or none), such as:

- Barbecue
- Buildings such as: barn, chicken coop, doghouse, garage, gazebo, accessory dwelling unit, outhouse, playhouse, sauna, shed, smokehouse, workshop, etc.
- Compost bin
- Decking
- Fencing
- Garden
- Garden furniture (bench, patio table and chairs, umbrella, etc.)
- Landscaping with or without a lawn or just dirt
- Playground equipment (sandbox, slide, swing set, etc.)
- Renewable energy generator (solar panels, windmills, etc.)
- Sandpit also known as a sandbox (US and Canada)
- Storage tank
- Swimming pool and/or hot tub
- Swing
- Hammock
- Vehicle
- Waste container
- Landscape lighting

== Gallery ==
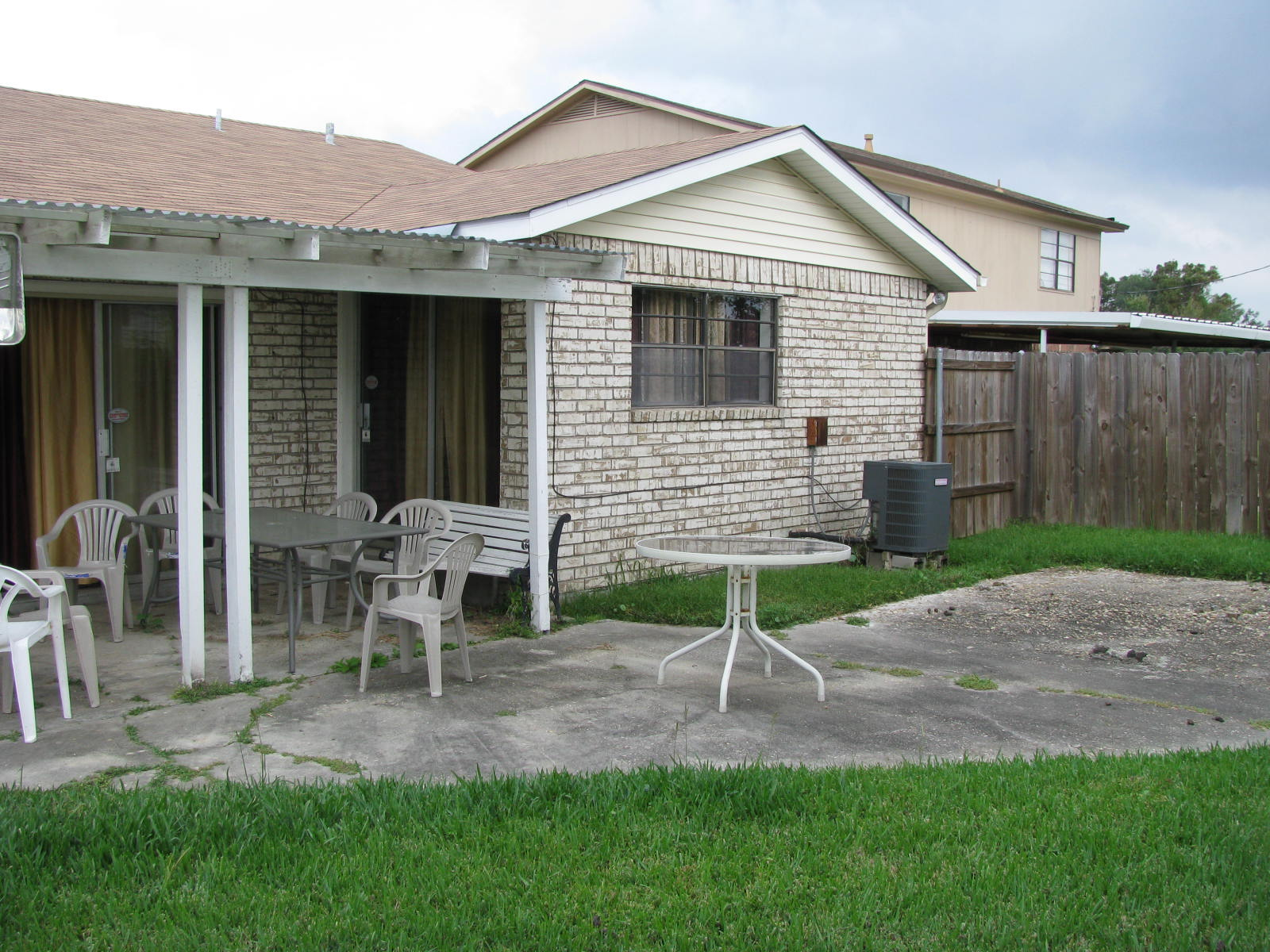
Back yard of a house in Harvey, Louisiana, United States

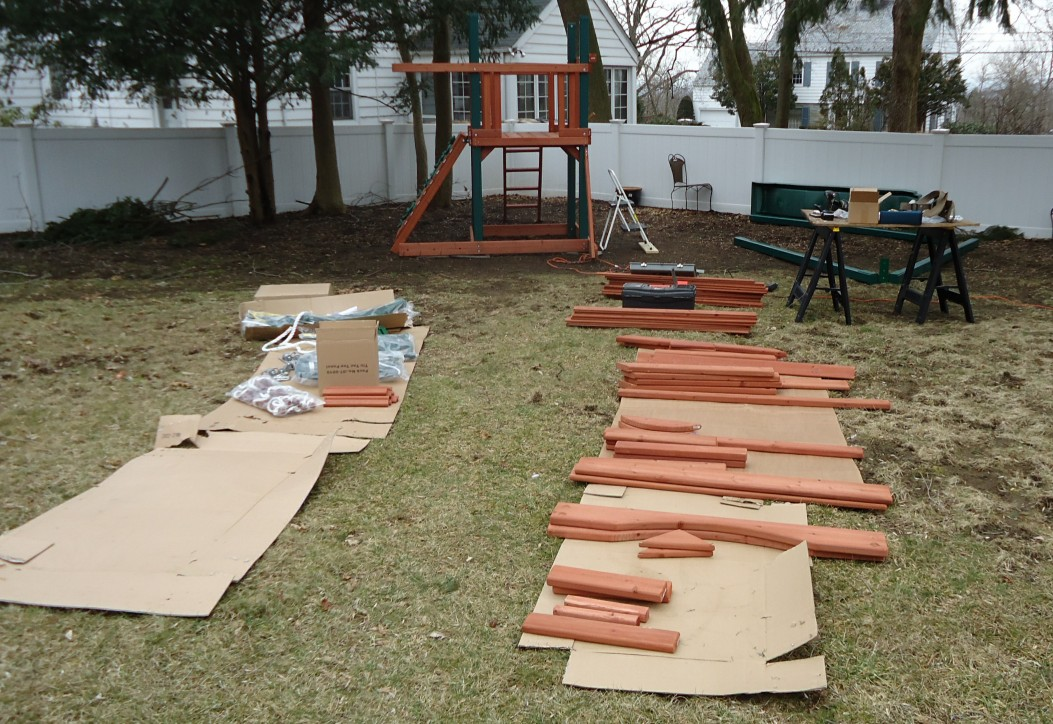
A playground being built for a homeowner's backyard as part of a handyman project

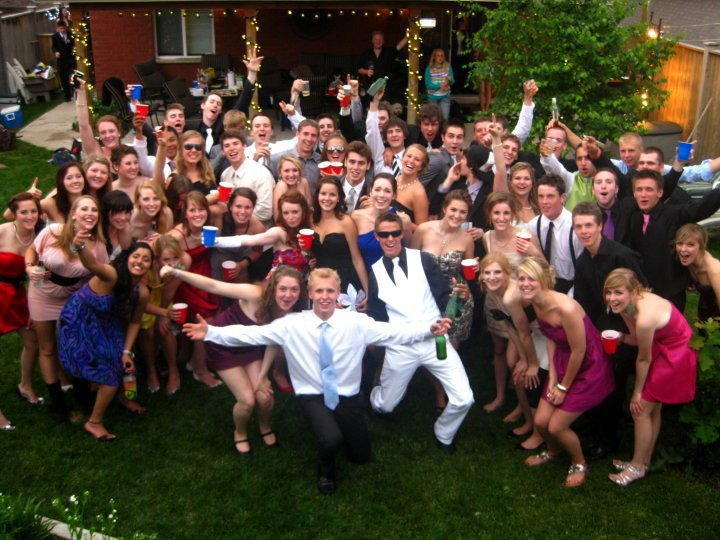
People posing at a backyard party in Canada

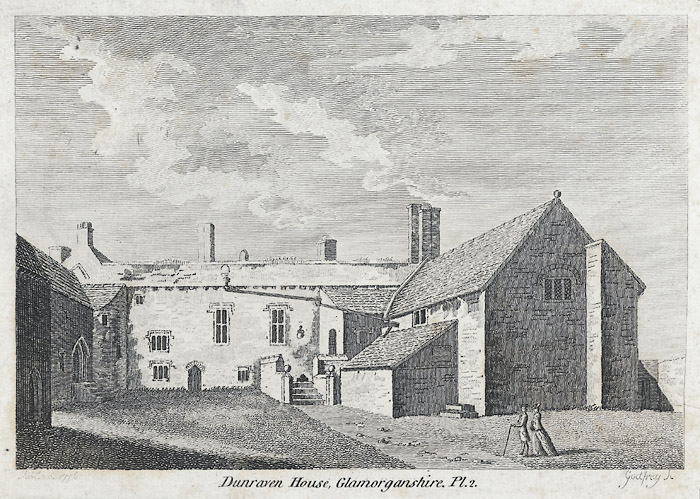
The backyard of Dunraven House, Wales, 1776

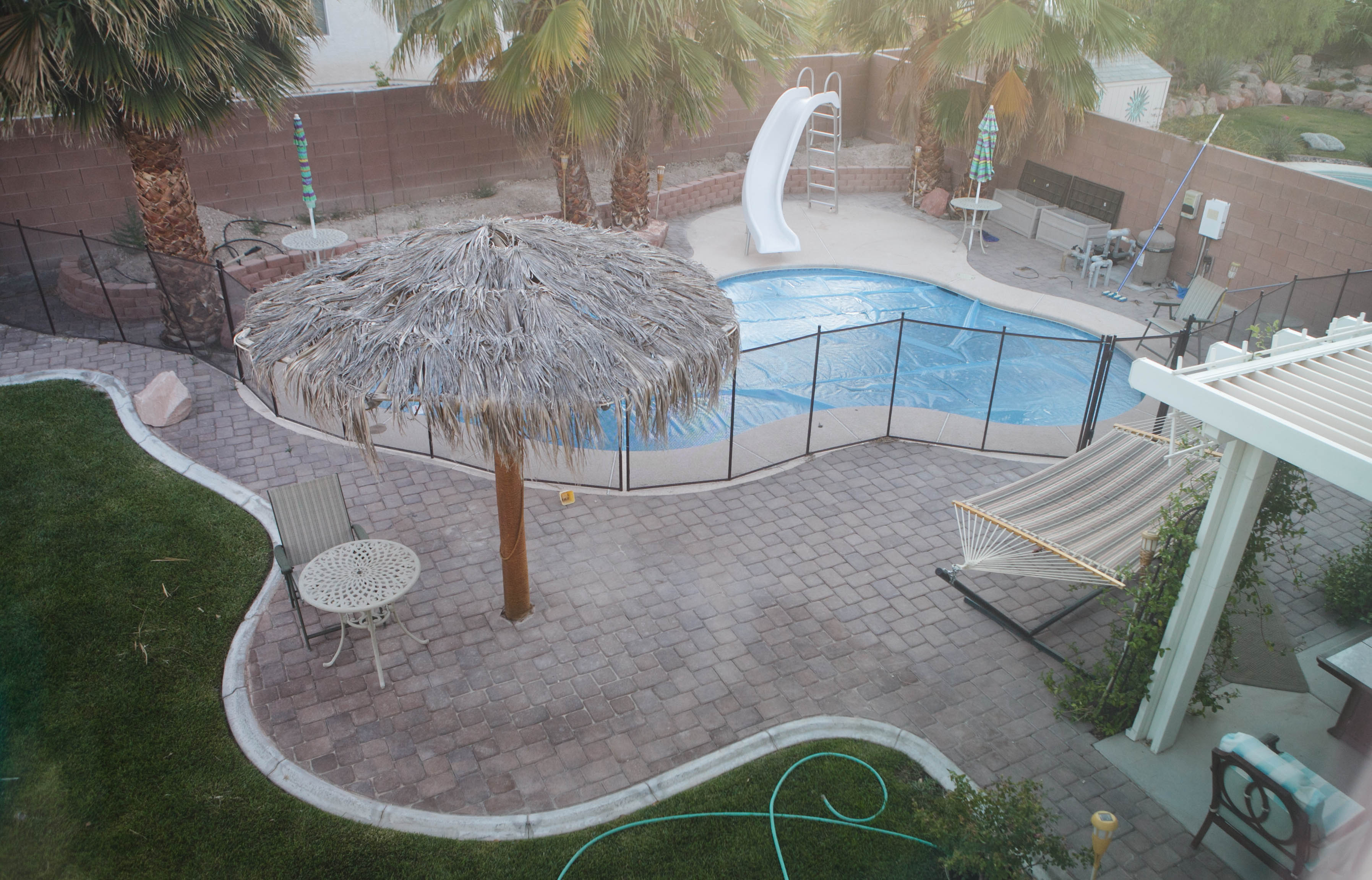
Backyard with pool in Las Vegas, Nevada, United States

== See also ==
- America's Backyard
- Backyard breeder
- Backyard compost
- Backyard chickens
- Backyard furnace
- Backyard pond
- Front yard
- List of garden types
- Yard (land)
