= Eglu =

Brand of chicken coop marketed in the UK

Omlet Ltd
- Company type: Private
- Industry: Pet Products
- Founded: 2004
- Founder: James Tuthill, Johannes Paul, Simon Nicholls, William Windham
- Headquarters: Wardington, England, UK
- Area served: Worldwide
- Products: Eglu
- Number of employees: 30
- Website: omlet.co.uk

Eglu
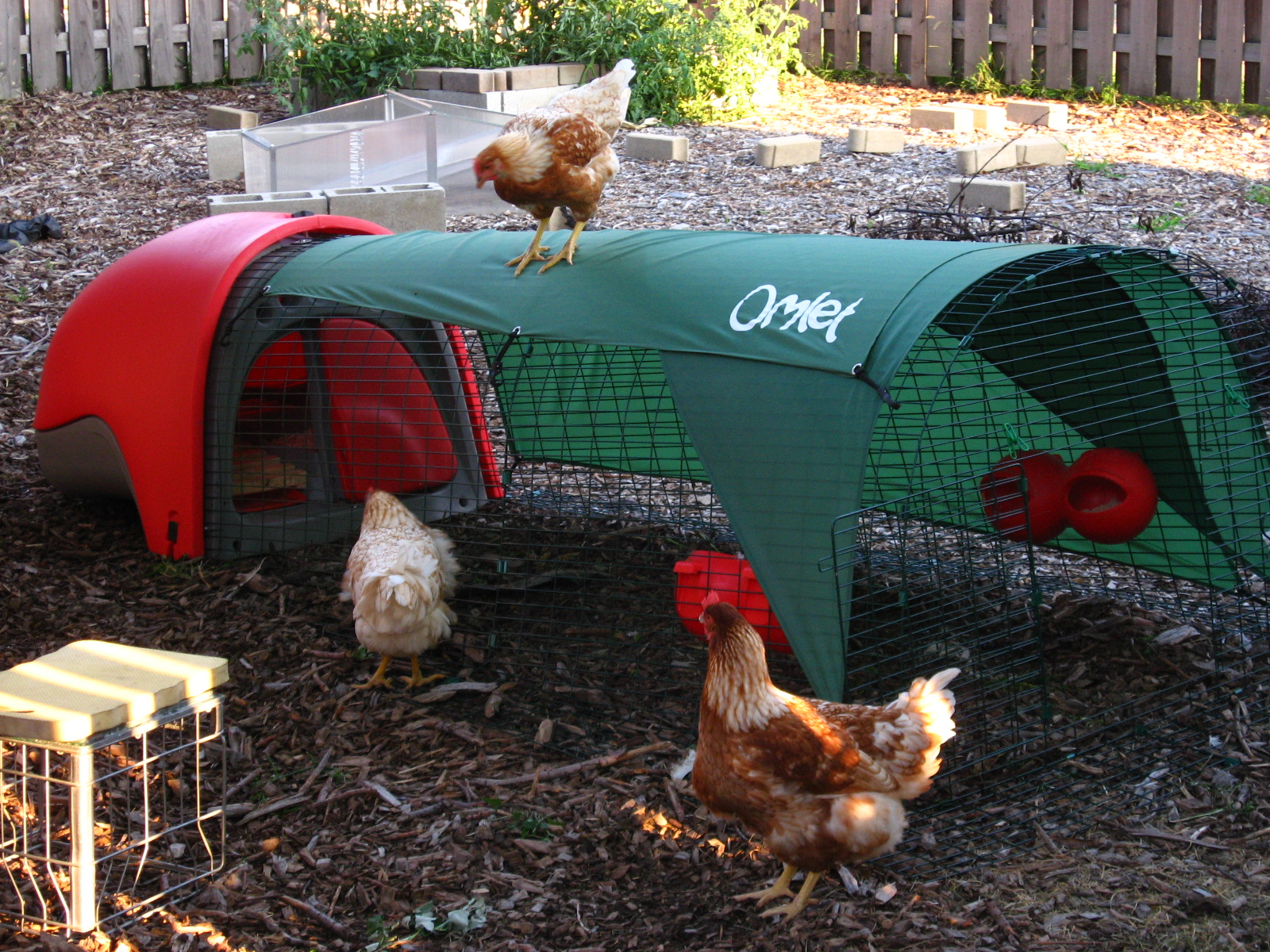
- A red Eglu (equipped with standard accessories) is home to a trio of hens

The Omlet Ltd Eglu is a brand of chicken coop marketed in the UK. The Eglu is intended for small-scale, backyard chicken keeping. The original design was created by four graduates from the Royal College of Art.

== Background ==
Omlet Ltd was founded in 2004 by James Tuthil, Johannes Paul, Simon Nicholls and William Windham. The company's introductory product, the Eglu, has won a number of awards, including the BSI Design Award and the Horners Award. It comes in several colours, and features a run of 220 centimetres (about 7 feet). The Eglu itself is roughly 80 centimetres (2 feet, 8 inches) long and wide. The company also sells exactly the same models for rabbits and guinea pigs.

== Markets and marketing ==
Since its founding, Omlet has grown into one of the largest chicken house retailers in the United Kingdom. The company is based in Wardington, Great Britain, and sells to customers worldwide including the U.S., Germany, France and Holland.

== See also ==
- Chickens as pets
