= Yardbird =

Yardbird or Yardbirds may refer to:

== People ==
- A slang term for a basic trainee in the armed forces
- A slang term for a prisoner or convict
- Charlie Parker, American saxophonist
- George Yardley, American basketball player

== Animals ==
- A colloquialism for the domestic chicken in the American Deep South

== Science and industry ==
- Railyard, sections of parallel train tracks, where many rail cars are
- Yardbird Southern Table & Bar, a chain of restaurants serving food from the Southern United States

== Music and literature ==
- Yardbird Reader, journal edited by Ishmael Reed from 1972 to 1976
- The Yardbirds, a British psychedelic band
  - Roger the Engineer, album originally self-titled as Yardbirds
