= Barnyard =

Enclosed or open yard adjoined to a barn

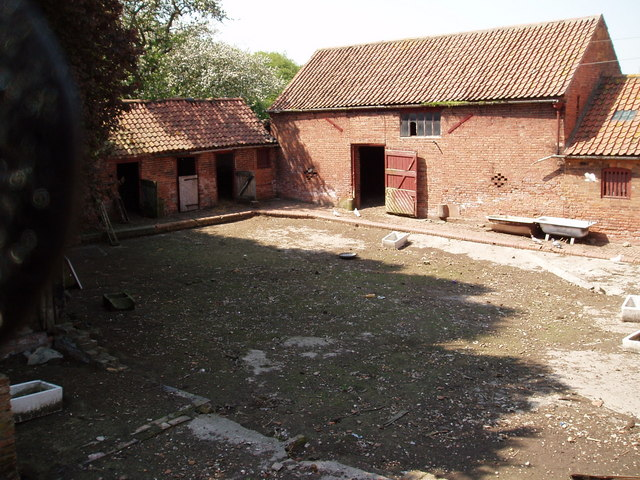
Farmyard in Nottinghamshire

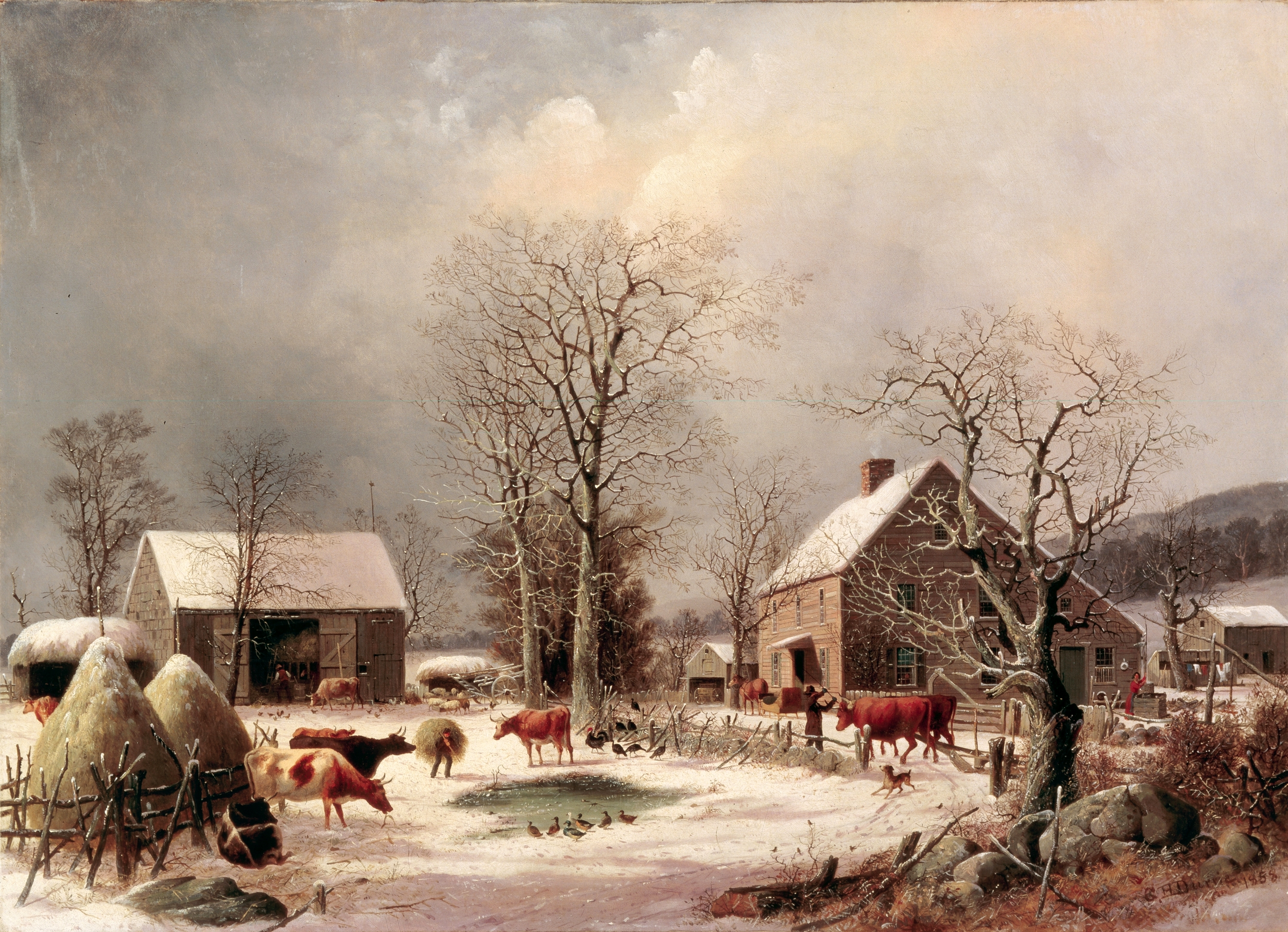
A romantic painting titled Farmyard in Winter by George Henry Durrie, 1858, U.S.A.

A barnyard or farmyard is an enclosed or open yard adjoining a barn, and, typically, related farm buildings, including a farmhouse. Enclosed barnyards are usually formed by a combination of fences and farm structures.

== Description ==
A barnyard of the 19th century was fenced-in an area of about 1-acre (4,000 m^{2}) or more; modern barnyards per se may not be as large, but agricultural properties still may use a perimeter fence around areas of concentrated animal management to help contain any that may get loose. The barnyard is the domain of the mules, horses, and other working animals, as well as fowl and working pets, such as barn cats. On small farms, pasture animals such as milk goats or a dairy cow may stay in the barnyard when not in the fields.

Depending on climate, barnyards may contain trees for shade. A water source is also common; the watering trough in past times was supplied by water from a hand driven well, with the water kept in wooden or metal containers. The water trough was filled daily, perhaps by a pitcher pump, or by windmill power. Pumping the trough full, by hand, was often the chore of farm children. In modern times, a trough may be hand-filled with a hose, or an automatic water fountain designed for livestock may be installed in one or more locations.

A large barn is often central to the barnyard, storing farm equipment, and providing stalls for the farm animals. In traditional designs, a hayloft often occupies the second floor, and a barn cupola caps off the hayloft. In some barns, the loft has a series of openings in the floor just above the stalls to send hay into the mangers below. In some places, the barn houses a corn crib and a corn sheller. Feed storage, however, is also a boon to mice and rats, so farmers often keep barn cats to control vermin.

== See also ==
- Courtyard
- Feedlot
