= Ravensworth Nurseries =

Garden centre in North Yorkshire, England

Ravensworth Nurseries Ltd, (historically trading as Bradbrook & Hannah) was an English horticultural business and garden centre located in Ravensworth, North Yorkshire.

It supplied garden centres and retailers across the United Kingdom as well as its own on-site sales.

== History ==
Brothers-in-law Douglas Bradbrook and William Hannah established the business in 1966 and initially grew tomatoes and lettuces.

Increased competition from the Common Market and rising heating costs necessitated a move into bedding plants and later pot plants such as poinsettias. Ravensworth Nurseries became one of only two businesses to grow poinsettias commercially in the United Kingdom, producing around 18,000 plants in 2012.

In 1996 they erected the world's largest hanging basket. The basket weighed 5 long tons (5.1 tonnes), was 23 feet (7 metres) across and 9 feet (2.7 metres) high and contained 1,000 plants of one hundred different varieties.

By 2006, the business had a £1.8 million annual turnover, six acres of glasshouses and employed around 35 people. Since 2006 the business had used an eco-friendly woodchip burner to heat three of its glasshouses.

The business announced its closure in 2023, blaming "the culmination of lockdown, rising bills, and the ongoing cost of living crisis".
