= Flower box =

Planter or box container for flowers, plants

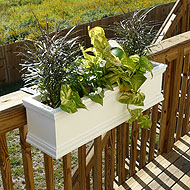
Flower box attached to a garden railing

A flower box is a type of container in the form of a planter or box that is usually placed outdoors and used for displaying live plants and flowers, but it may also be used for growing herbs or other edible plants.

It is usually placed or affixed to an accessible location so the resident of a home may easily work with the plants in the container. A flower box may be installed under a window and supported in place by brackets on the wall below, in which case it may be called a window box. Flower boxes may also be used to line decks, patios, porches, steps, and sidewalks and they can even be hung from railings.

Wood, brick, metal, fiberglass and cellular PVC can all be used in flower box construction, with wood being a classical material of choice. A typical wooden container will last 3–5 years before showing signs of rot. With painting and maintenance, they can sometimes last 10–15 years. Fiberglass has the advantage of being lightweight and insect proof. PVC is a plastic that is a rot proof alternative to wood, and is often used on homes to prevent rot or siding damage.

Sometimes, a box is placed inside a kitchen window in order to grow herbs or other supplies for a chef as an easily accessed miniature kitchen garden.

J. Linderski has argued that Pliny described flower boxes in his Naturalis Historia, at 19.59. However, Linderski could only find one other allusion to this practice in Martial 11.18.

== See also ==
- Flowerpot
- Urban horticulture
- Container garden
- List of gardening topics
- Window box
- Windowfarm
