= Window box =

Type of flower container

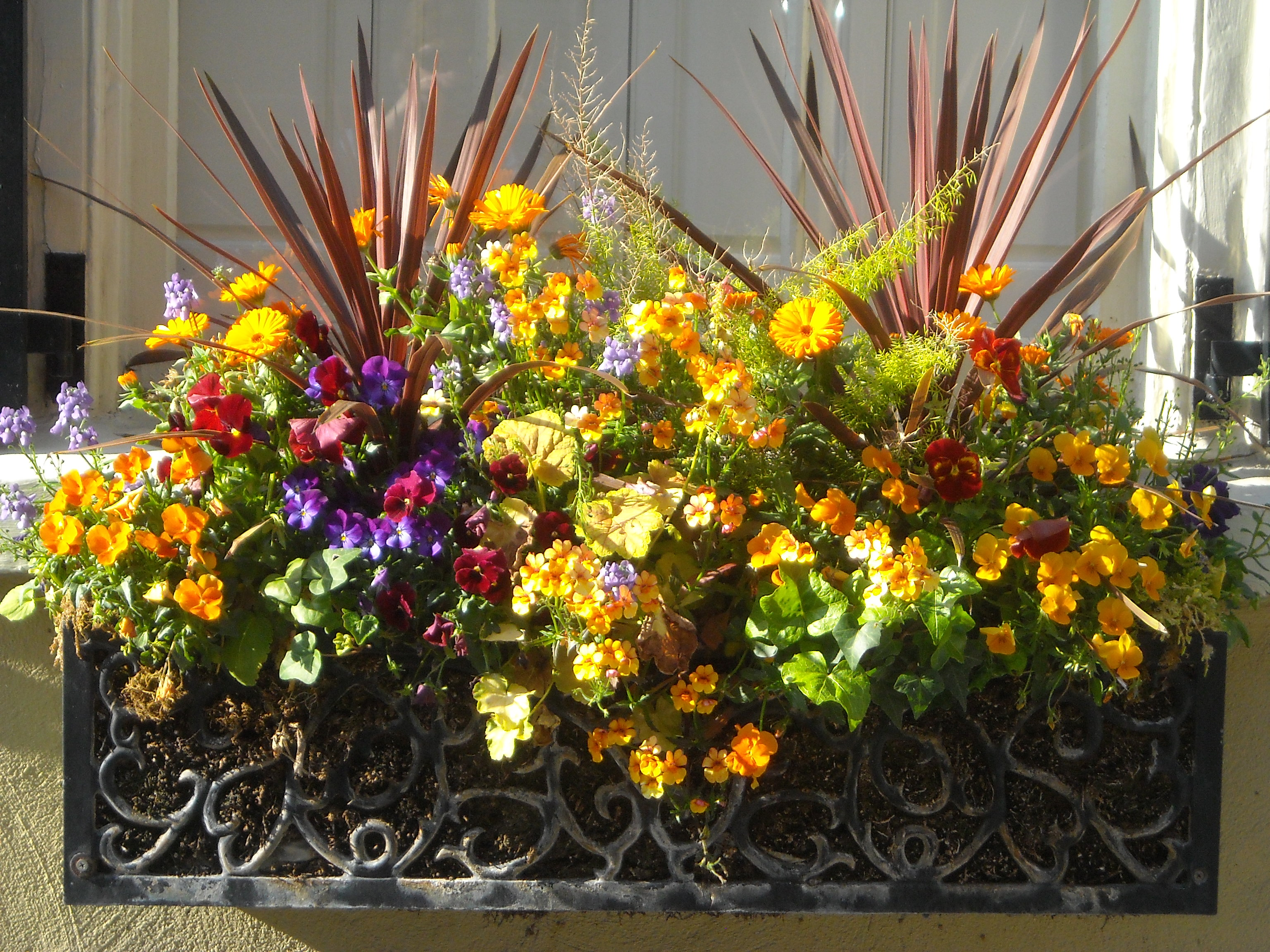
Window box in Charleston, South Carolina

A window box (sometimes called a window flower box or window box planter) is a type of flower container for live flowers or plants in the form of a box attached on or just below the sill of a window. It may also be used for growing herbs or other edible plants.

== Description ==
A window box is usually placed on a window sill, or fixed to the wall immediately below it, so the owner(s) can easily access the plants in it. When installed under a window, it is usually supported by brackets on the wall below. Some materials, such as PVC or fibreglass, use a cleat mounting system from behind to attach it to the building, or it may be bolted directly to the building without the use of support brackets.

Wood, brick, terracotta, metal, fibre glass, vinyl, and cellular PVC may all be used in window box construction. A typical wooden window box lasts 3–5 years before showing deterioration, though with painting and maintenance can last 10–15 years.

Window boxes are usually accessed from indoors, and are often used by people who live on upper floors without access to gardens or other plantable areas. They enable plants to be seen by those inside as well as outside. Larger boxes, 10–12 inches in height, can be used to plant items that need more root space, and to allow flowers and plants to be grown in multiple rows.

== Images ==
Window boxes

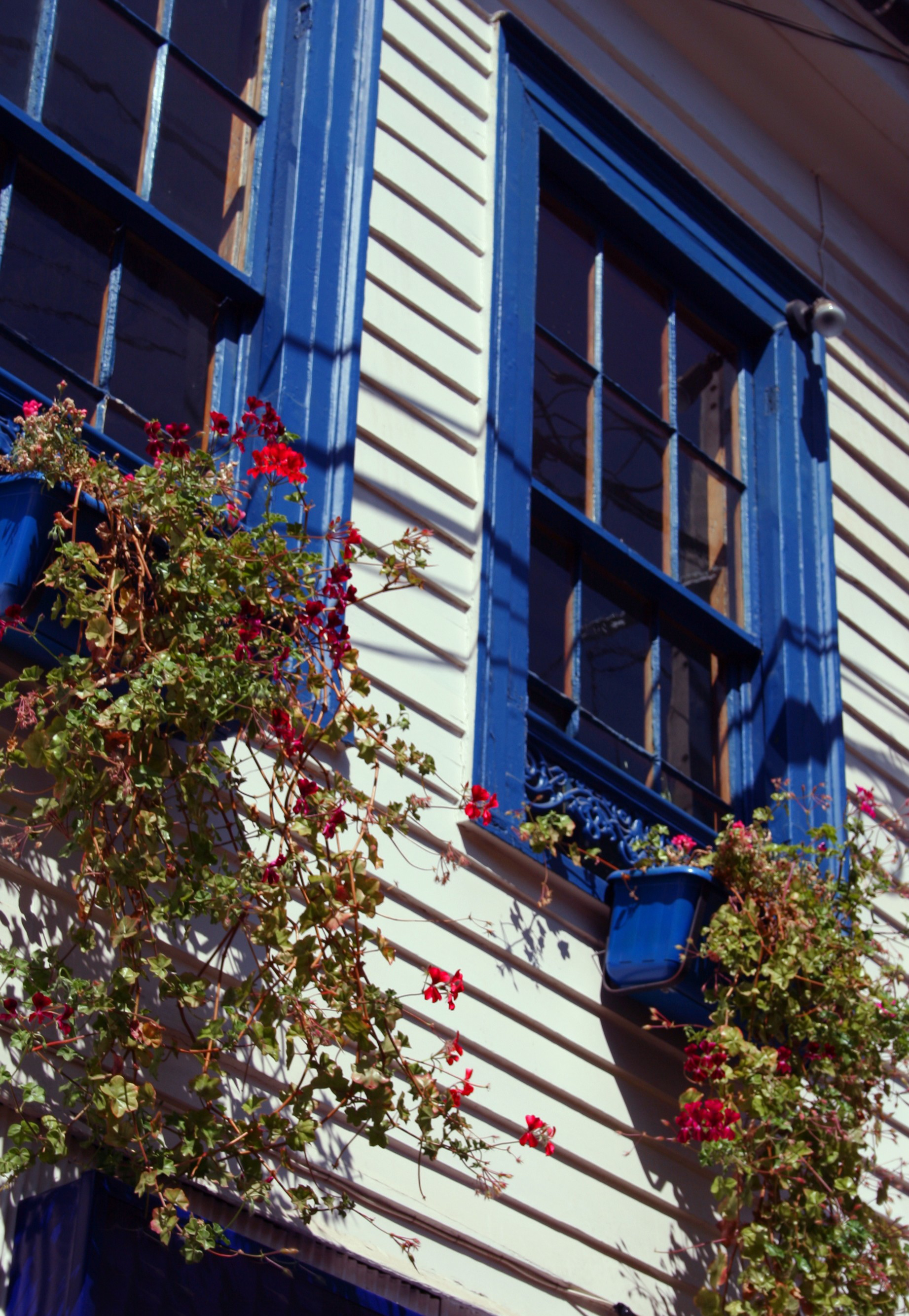
Valparaiso, Chile, 2000

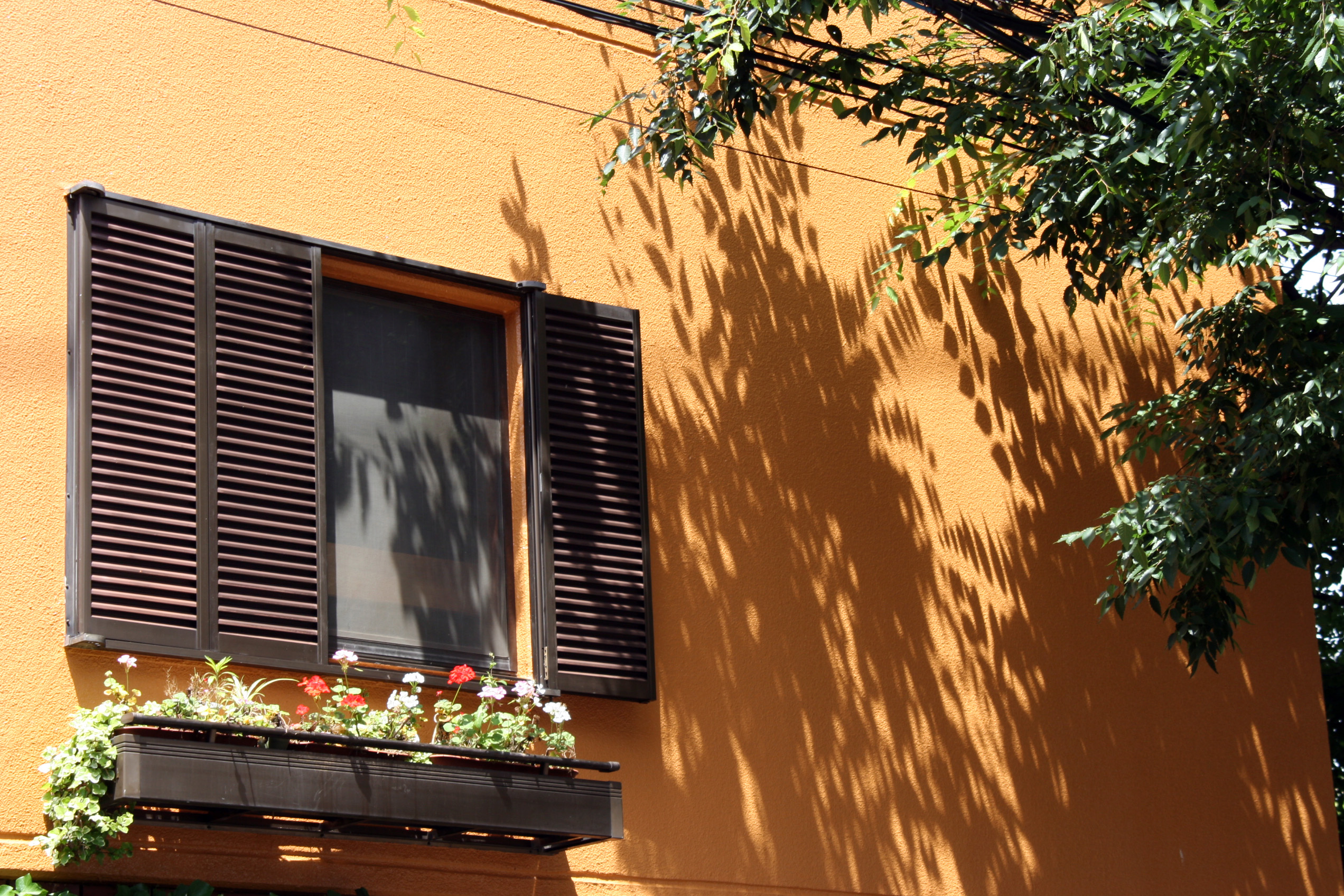
Tokyo, Japan, 2006

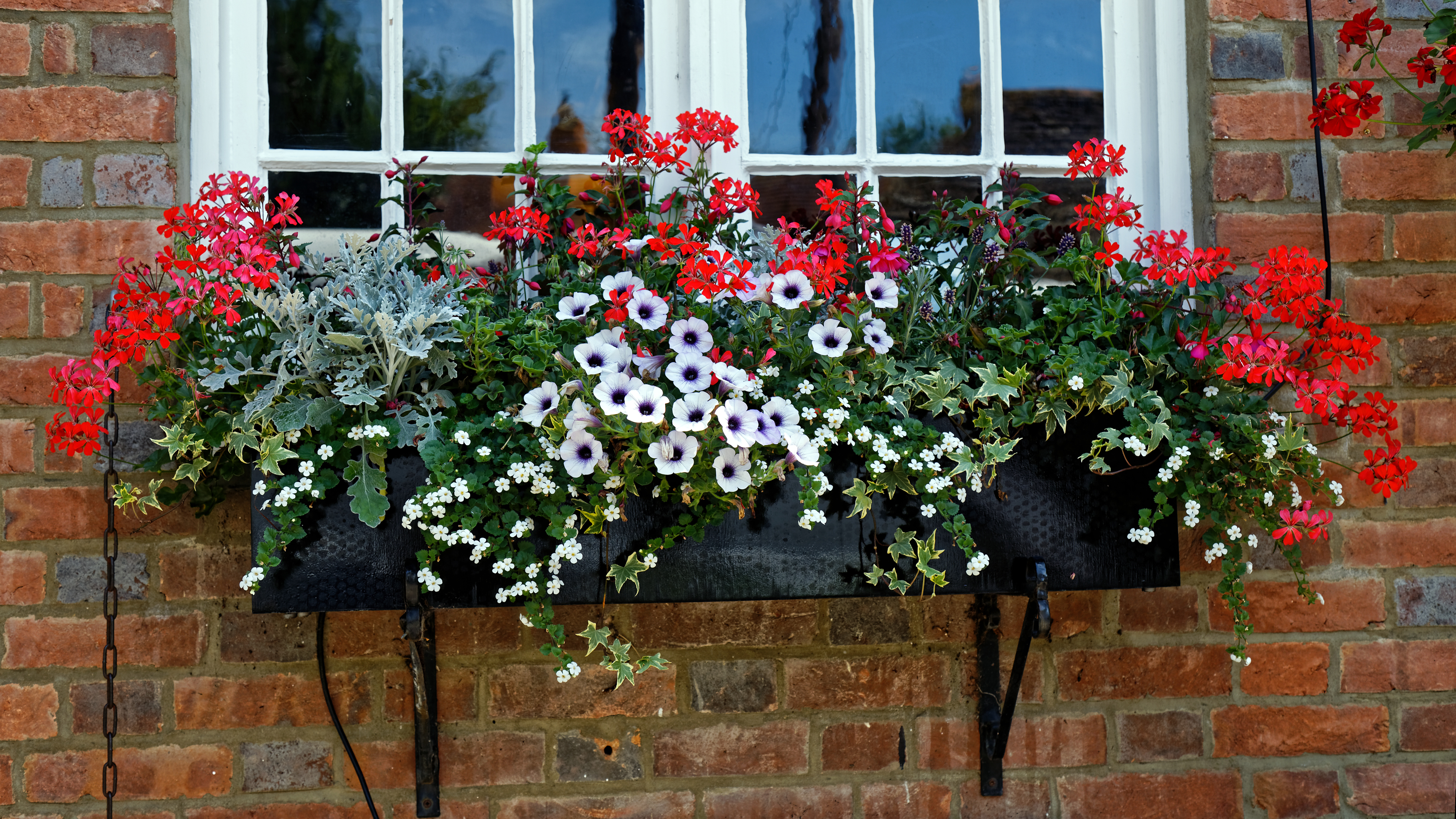
Nuthurst, West Sussex, England

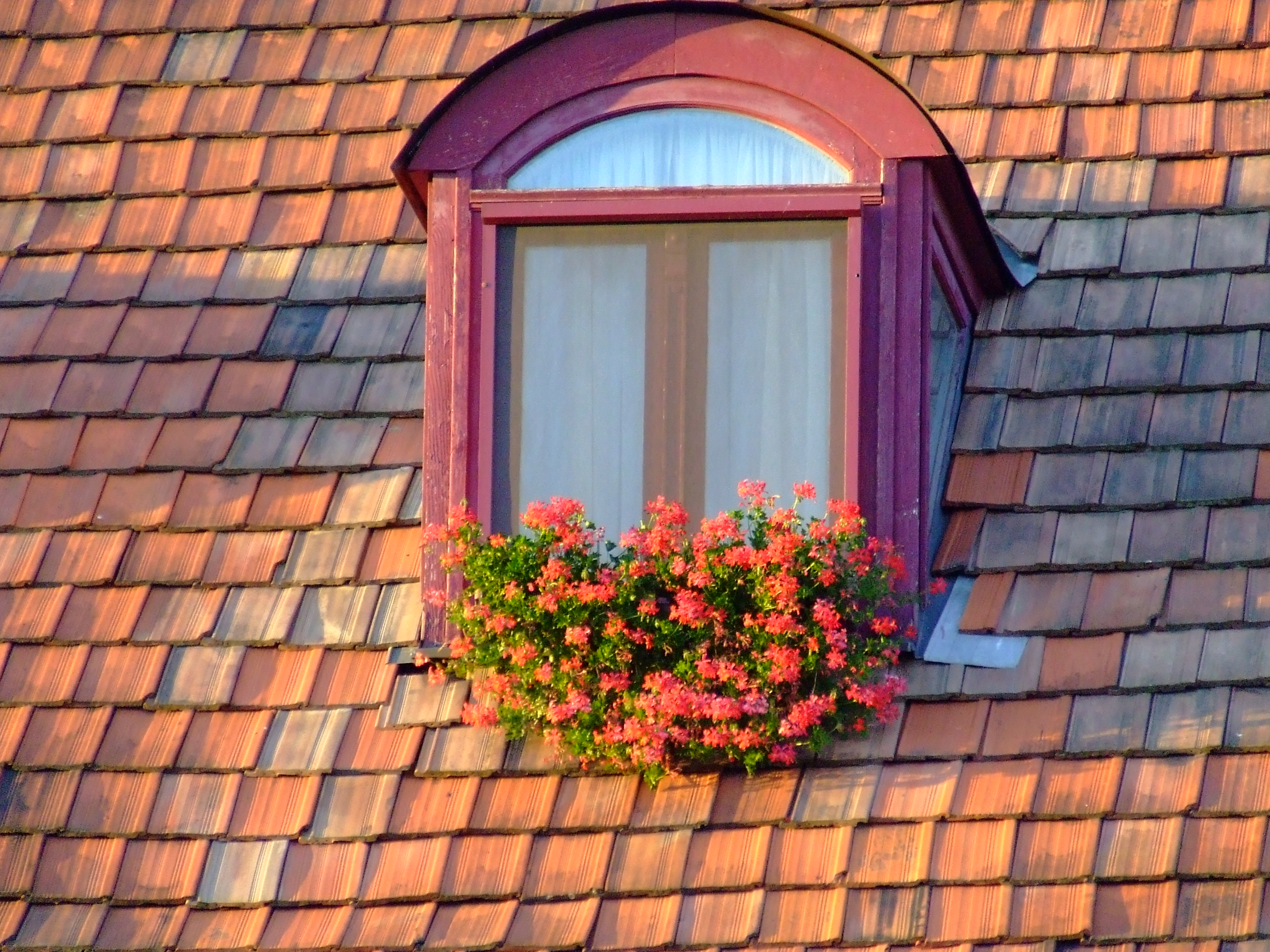
Eger, Hungary, 2008

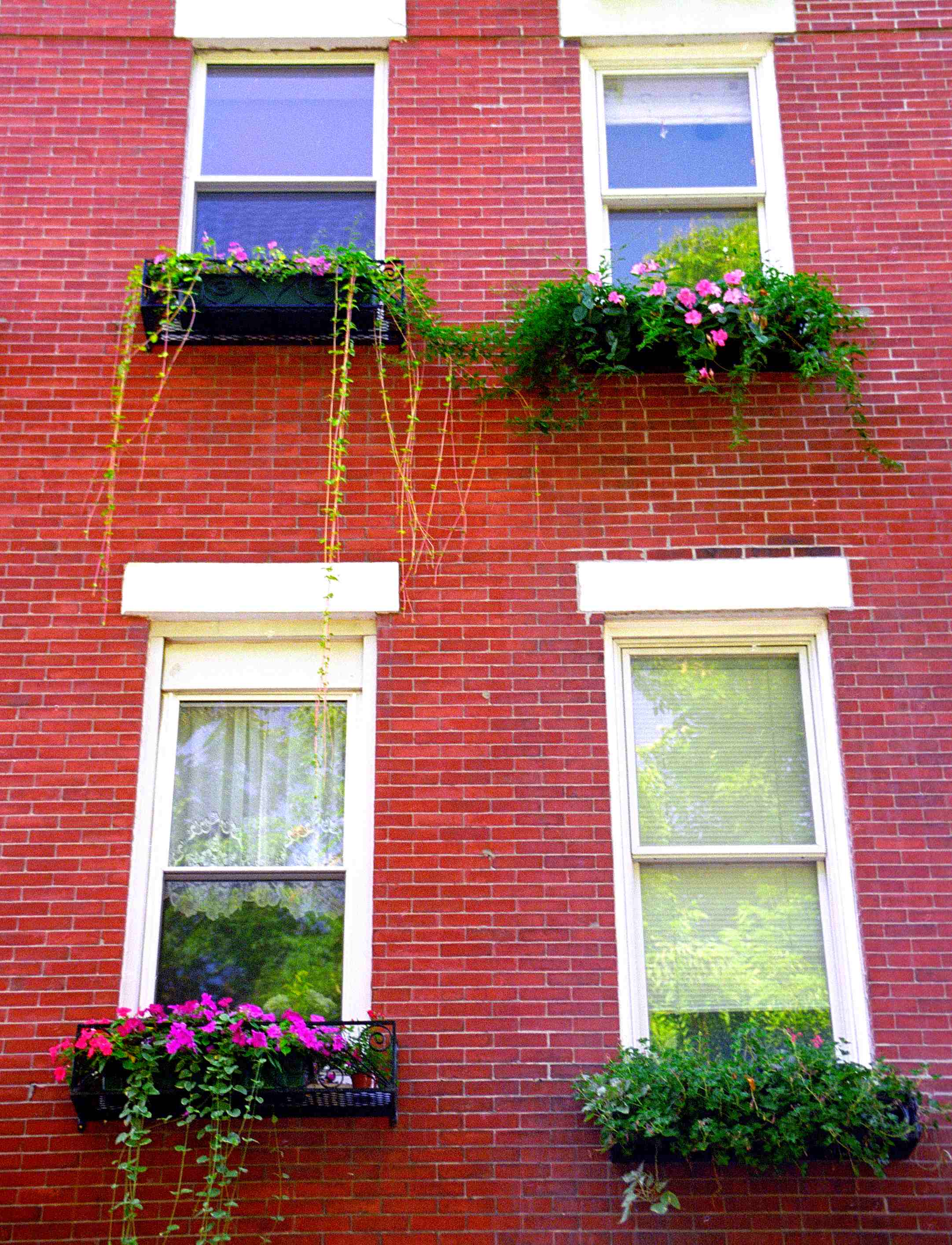
Boston, United States, 2008

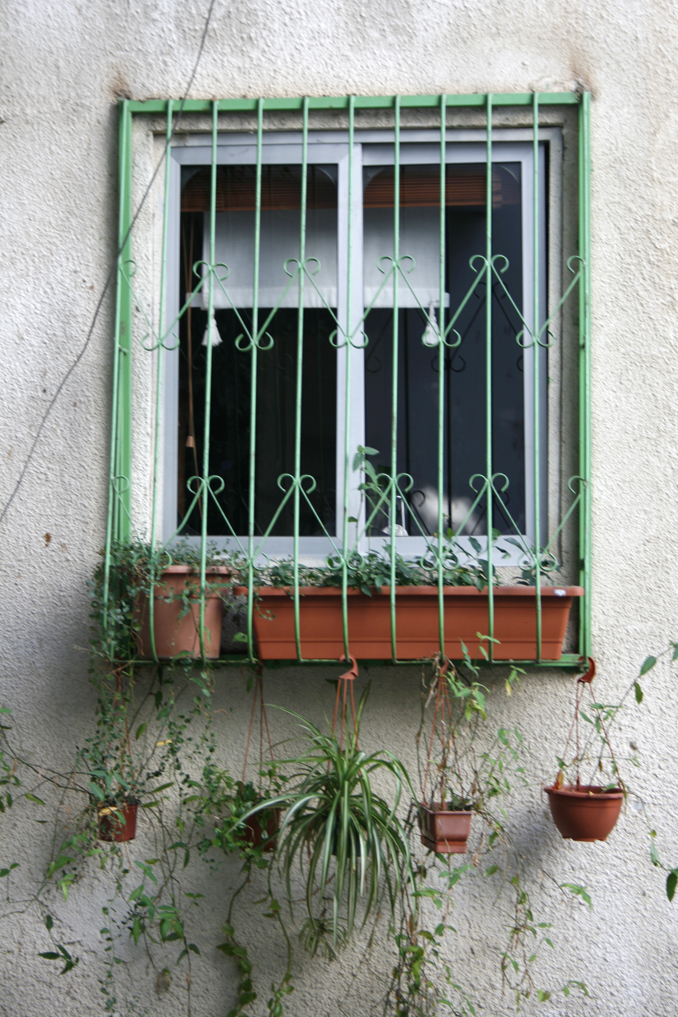
Tel Aviv, Israel, 2008

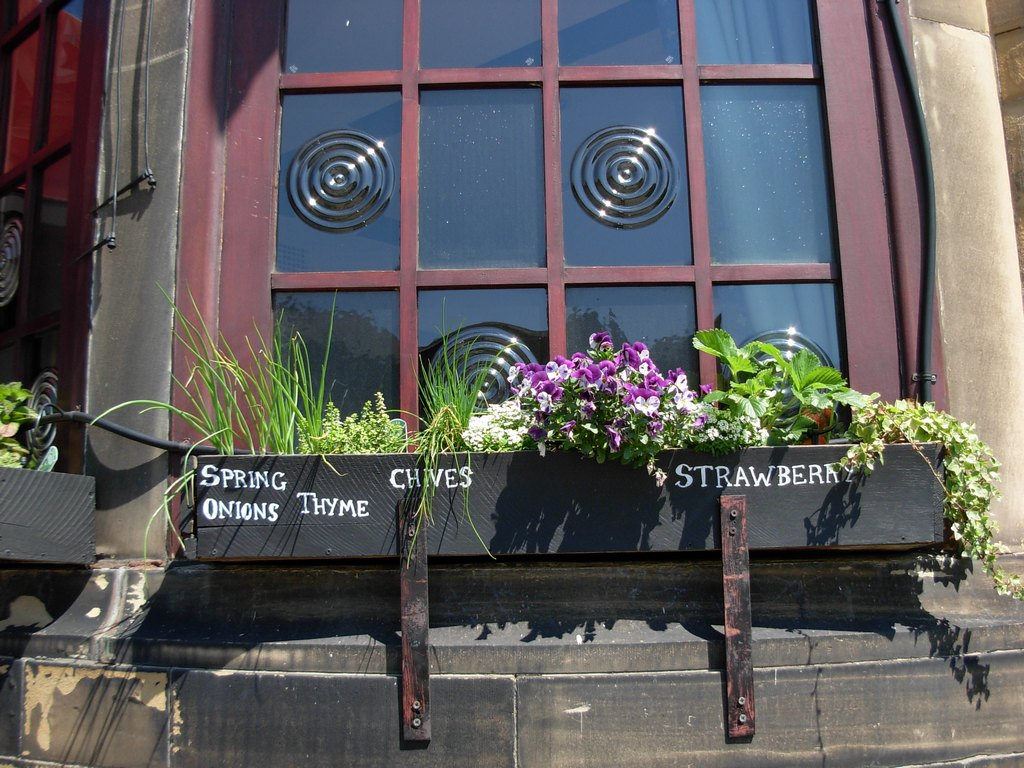
West Yorkshire, England, 2009

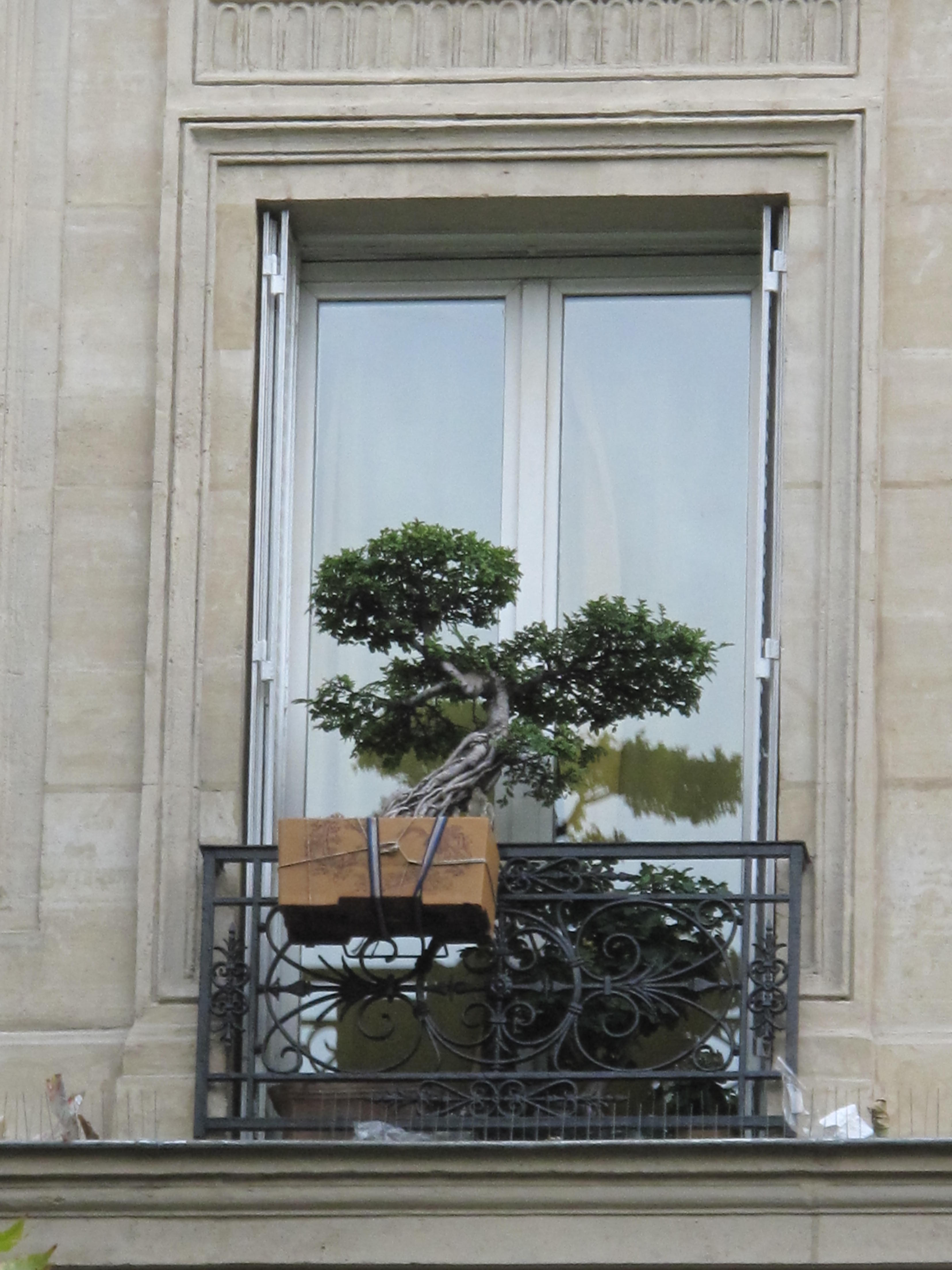
Paris, France, 2009

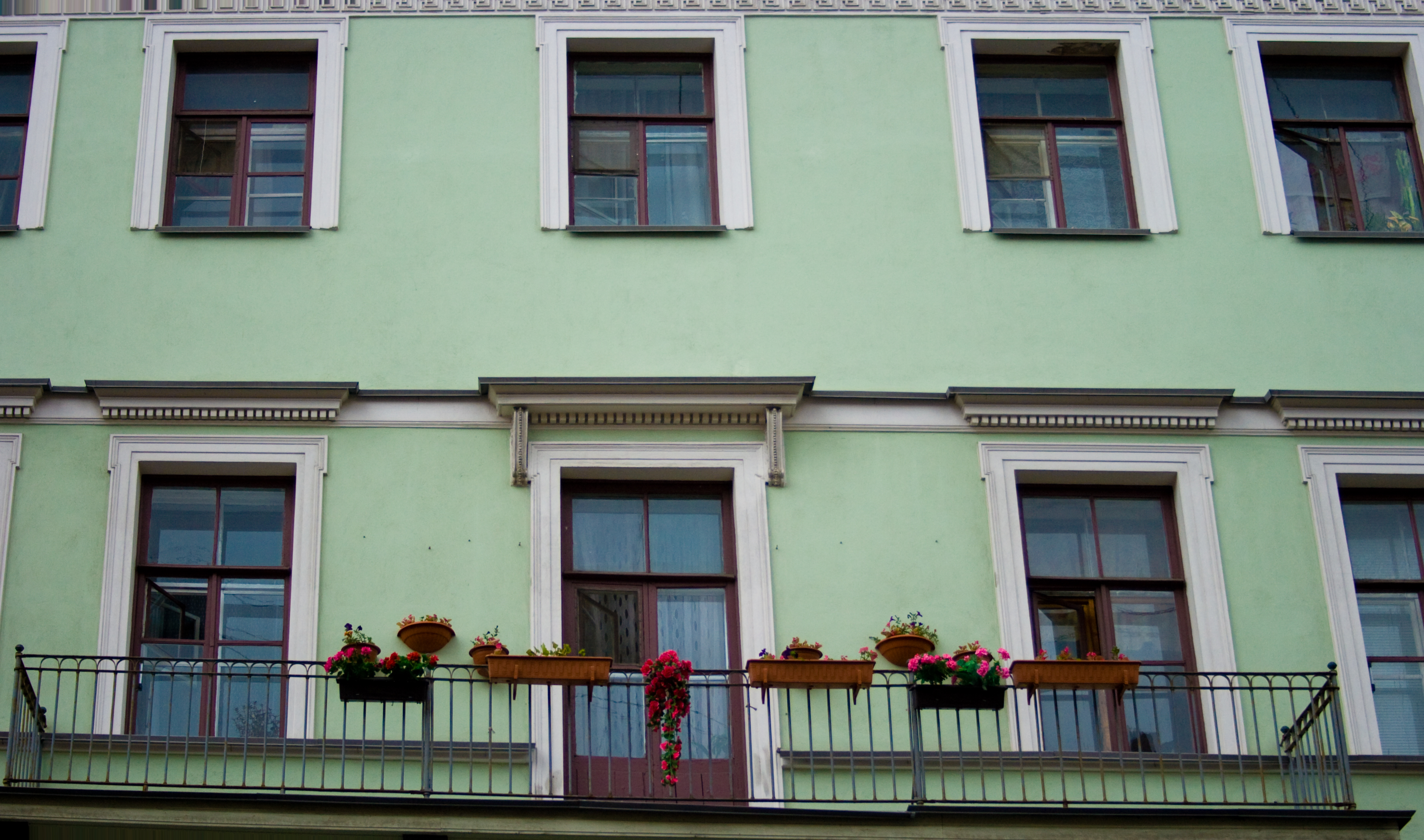
St. Petersburg, Russia, 2010

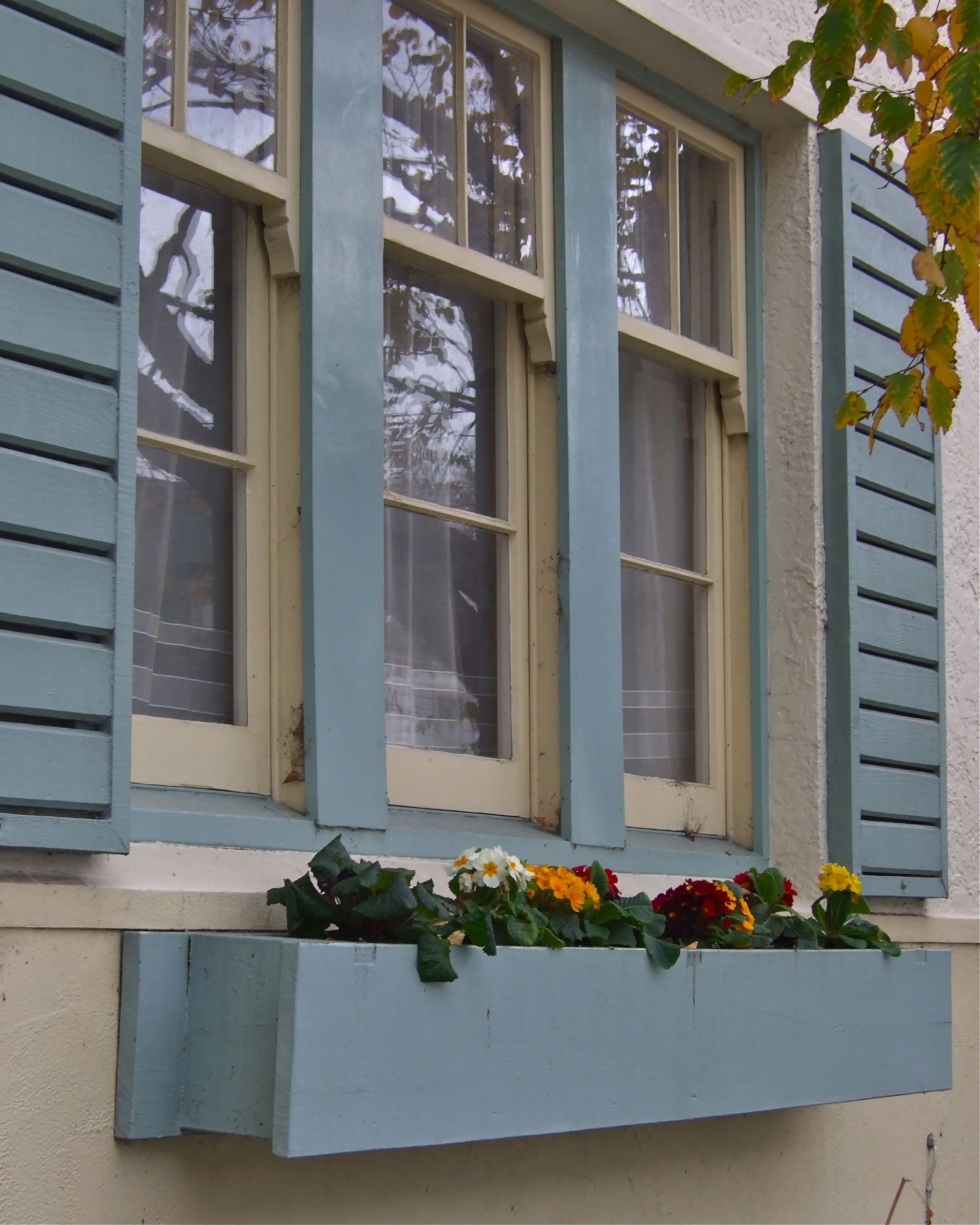
Wellington, New Zealand, 2010

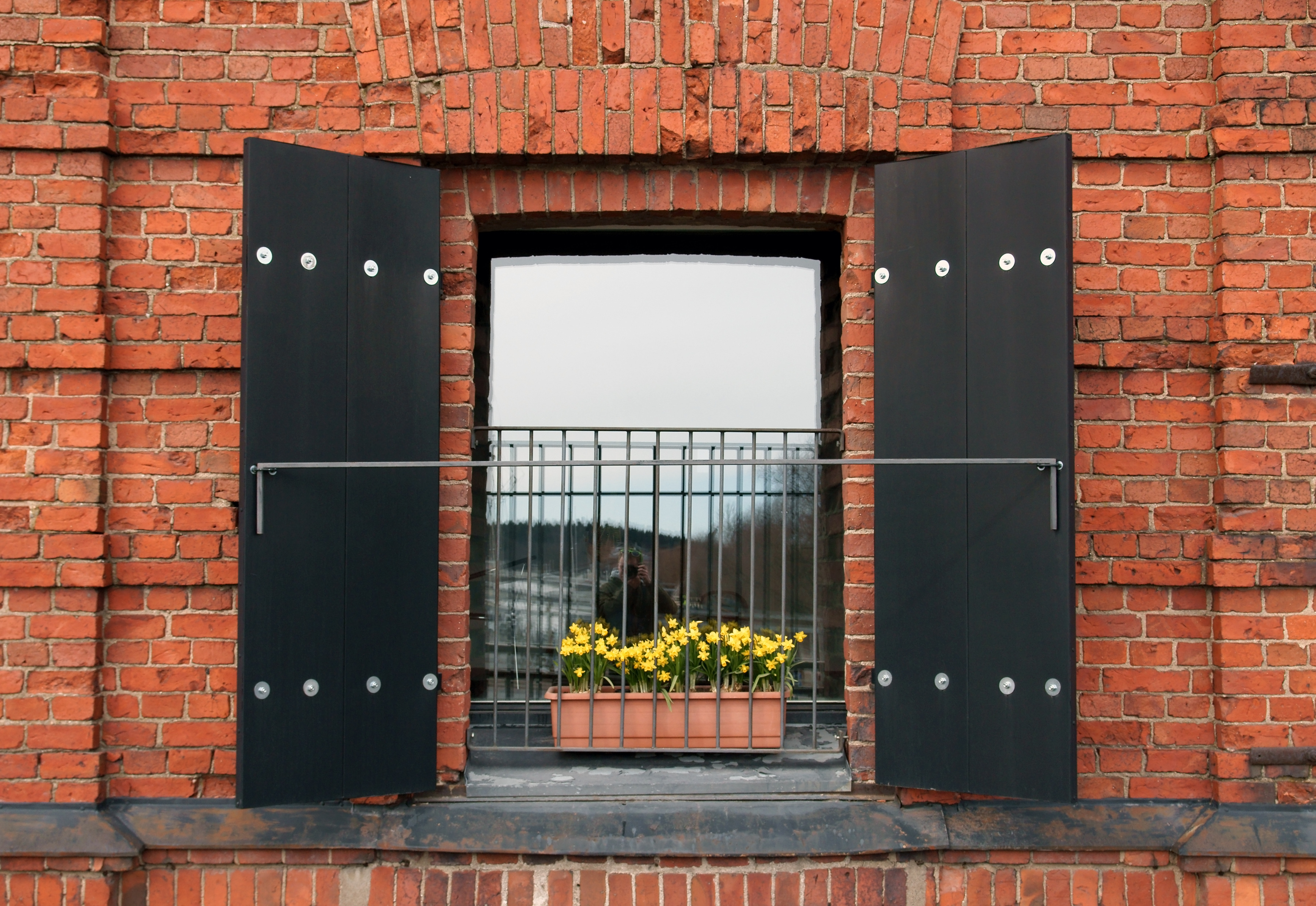
Porvoo, Finland, 2010

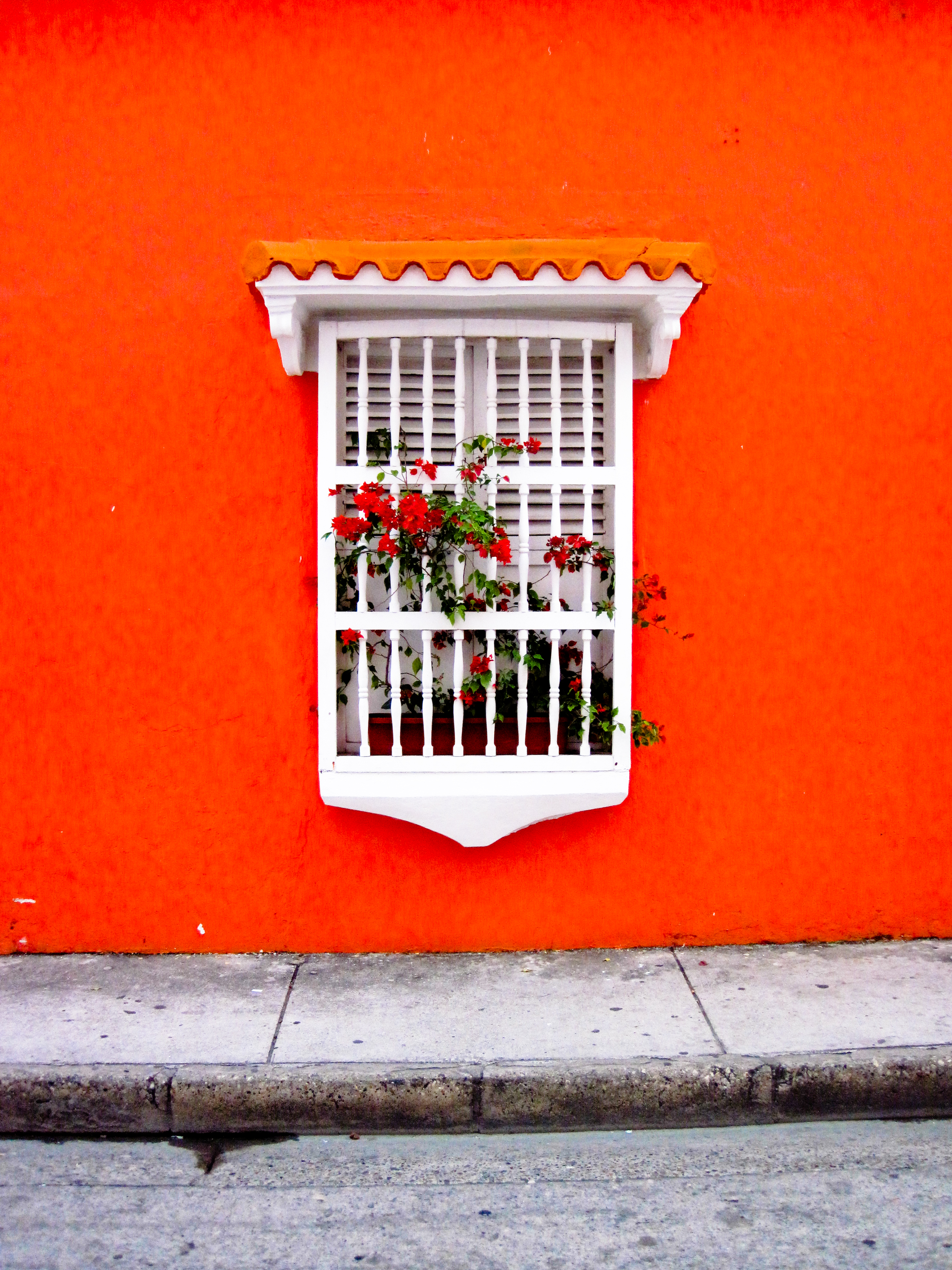
Cartagena, Colombia, 2011

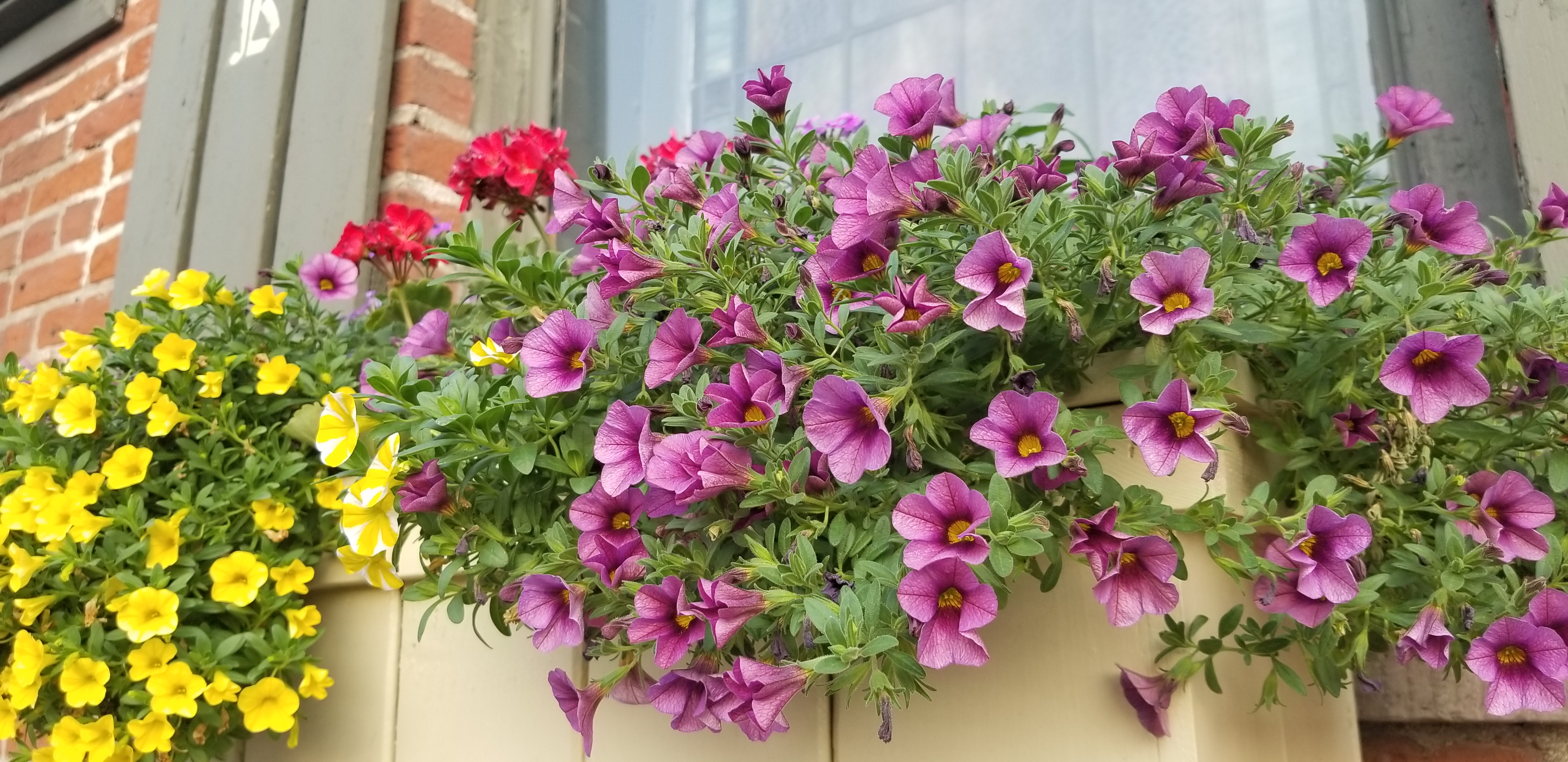
Denver, Colorado, 2021

== See also ==
- Balconet
- Container garden
- Flower box
- Flower pot
- List of gardening topics
- Urban horticulture
- Windowfarm

== Bibliography ==
- Mrs. F.A. Bardswell (1903). The book of town & window gardening. Handbooks of practical gardening; XIX. London: J. Lane – via HathiTrust.
