= Deadheading (flowers) =

Removing spent flowers from ornamental plants

Deadheading is the horticultural practice of removing spent flowers from ornamental plants.

Deadheading is a widespread form of pruning, since fading flowers are not as appealing and direct a lot of energy into seed development if pollinated. The goal of deadheading is thus to preserve the attractiveness of the plants in beds, borders, containers and hanging baskets, as well as to encourage further blooming. Deadheading flowers with many petals, such as roses, peonies, and camellias prevents them from littering. Deadheading can be done with fingers and thumb or with pruning shears, knife, or scissors.

Ornamental plants that do not require deadheading are those that do not produce a lot of seed or tend to deadhead themselves. These include lobelias, salvias, and fuchsias. Deadheading is undesirable if the plant's seed is enjoyed by birds, as is the case with many species from the family Asteraceae. Likewise, if the plant bears attractive seeds or fruits, deadheading is normally avoided.

== See also ==
- Deflowering (flowers)
