= Windowsill =

Horizontal structure immediately under a window

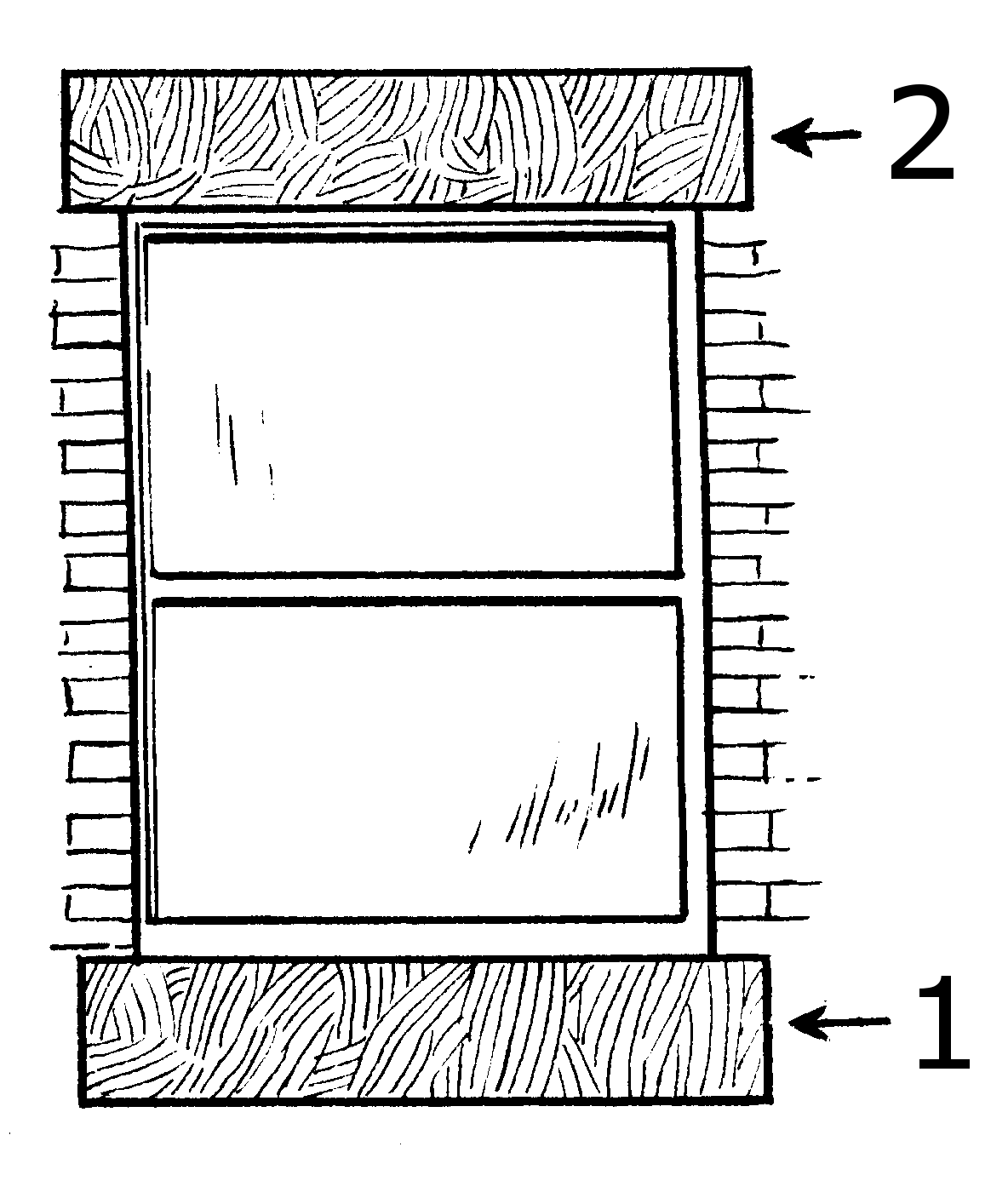
1. sill; 2. lintel

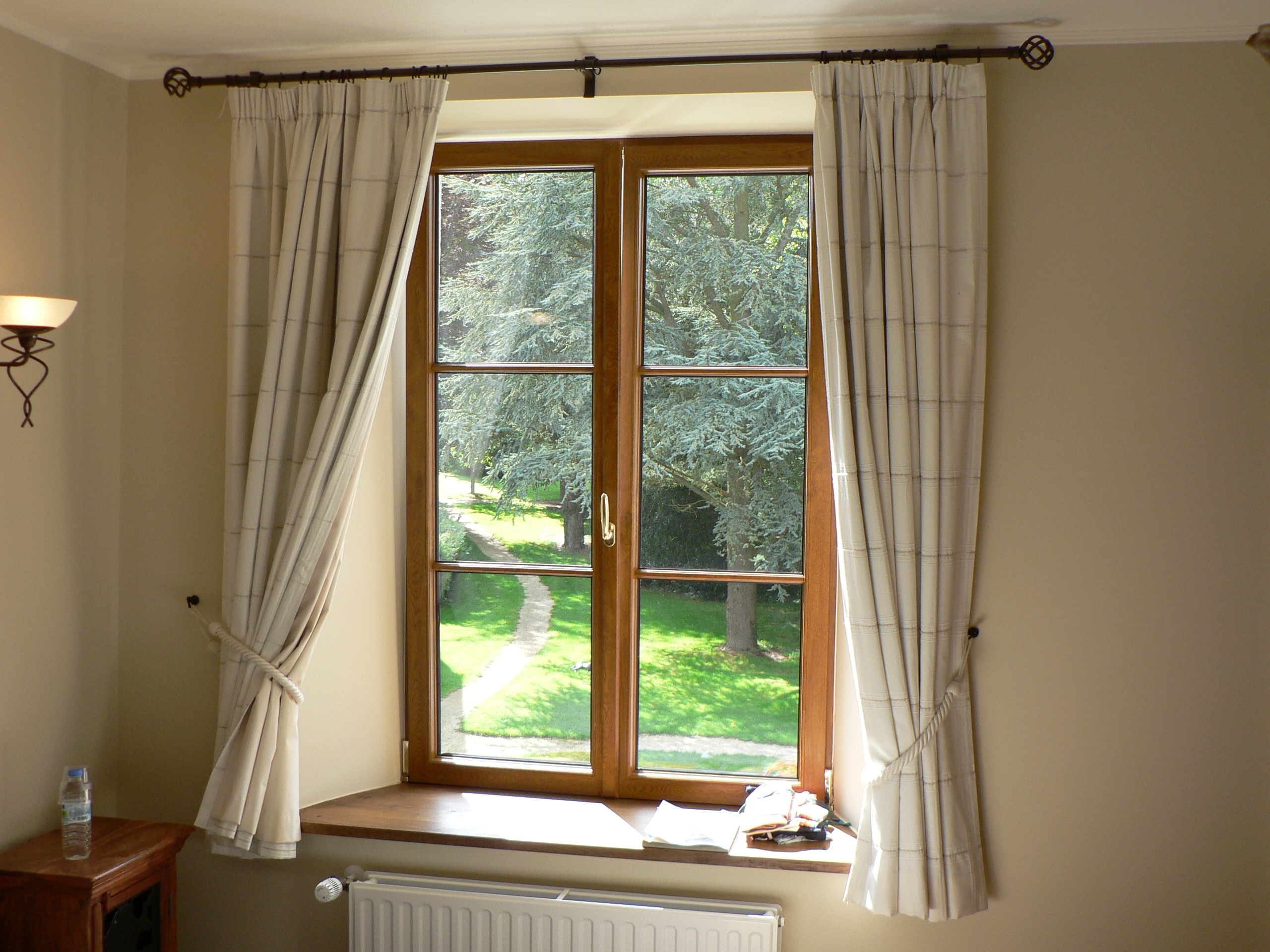
Books placed on an interior windowsill or stool

A windowsill (also written window sill or window-sill, and less frequently in British English, cill) is the horizontal structure or surface at the bottom of a window. Windowsills serve to structurally support and hold the window in place.

The exterior portion of a windowsill provides a mechanism for shedding rainwater away from the wall at the window opening. Therefore, windowsills are usually inclined slightly downward away from the window and wall, and often extend past the exterior face of the wall, so the water will drip off rather than run down the wall.

Some windowsills are made of natural stone, cast stone, concrete, tile, or other non-porous materials to further increase their water resistance.

Windows may not have a structural sill or the sill may not be sufficiently weather resistant. In these cases, a strip of waterproof and weather resistant material (steel, vinyl, PVC) called a sill pan may be used to protect the wall and shed the water. Like the sill, a sill pan will usually be inclined and protrude from the wall.

== Types ==
A windowsill in the most general sense is a horizontal structural element below a window opening or window unit in masonry construction or framed construction and is regarded as part of the window frame. The bottom of a window frame sits on top of the windowsill of the wall opening.

A windowsill may span the entire width of a wall from inside to outside, as is often the case in basic masonry construction, making it visible on both the interior and exterior of the building. In such a case, the exterior windowsill and interior windowsill would be two sides of the same structural element.

Conversely, a windowsill may only extend from the internal wall structure to the outside and not be visible from the building's interior. In that case, the window likely has a shelf-like piece of interior trim work—often made of wood, tile, or stone—which is distinct from the exterior windowsill. The technical term used by carpenters, window manufacturers, and other professionals for this piece of trim work is window stool, but it is also referred to as a windowsill. In residential buildings, some people use this latter kind of interior windowsill or stool to store houseplants, books, or other small personal items.

== See also ==
- Window box
- Window terms
