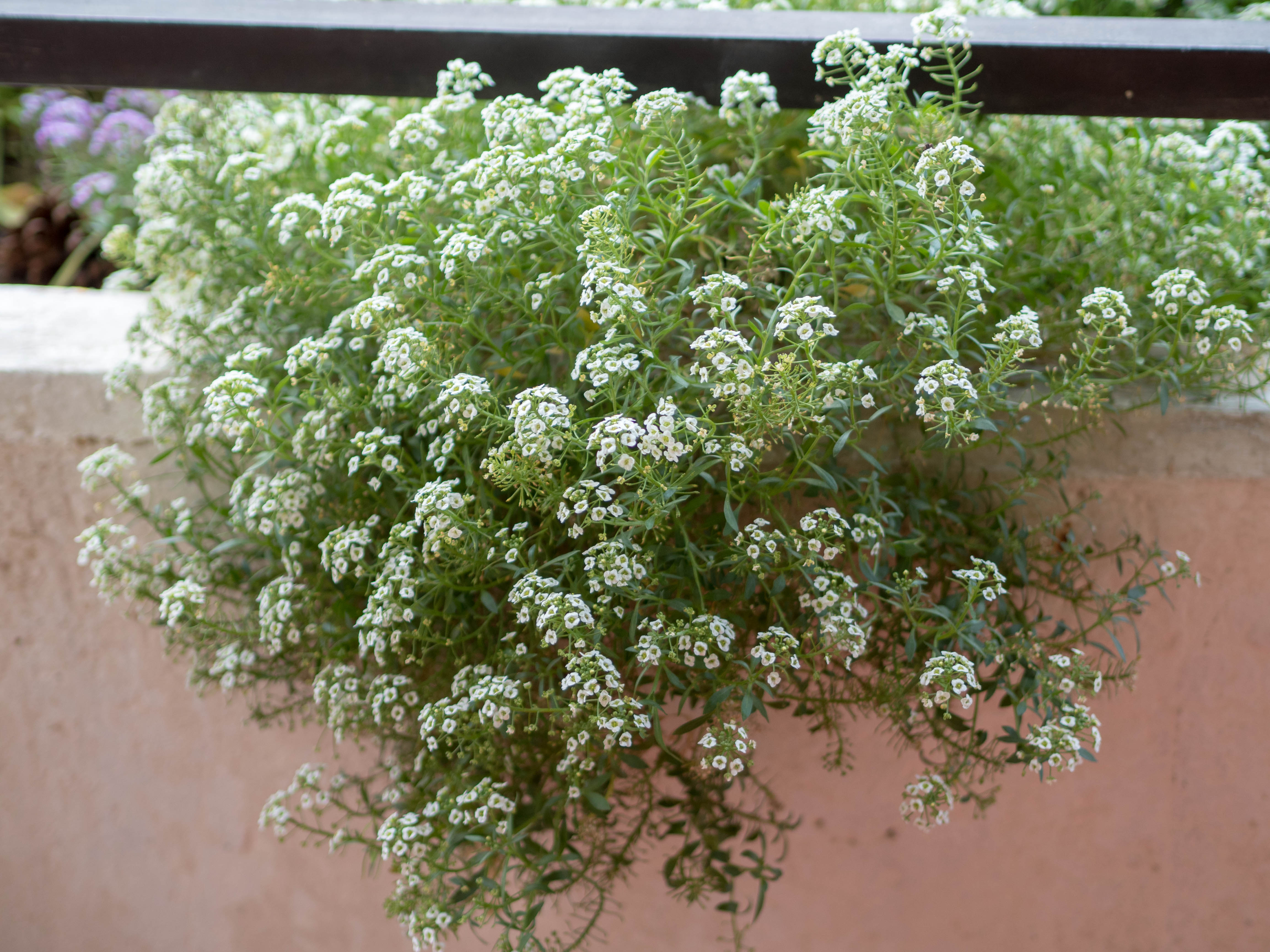

Scientific classification
- Kingdom: Plantae
- Clade: Tracheophytes
- Clade: Angiosperms
- Clade: Eudicots
- Clade: Rosids
- Order: Brassicales
- Family: Brassicaceae
- Genus: Lobularia
- Species: L. maritima

Binomial name
- Lobularia maritima (L.) Desv.

= Lobularia maritima =

Species of flowering plant

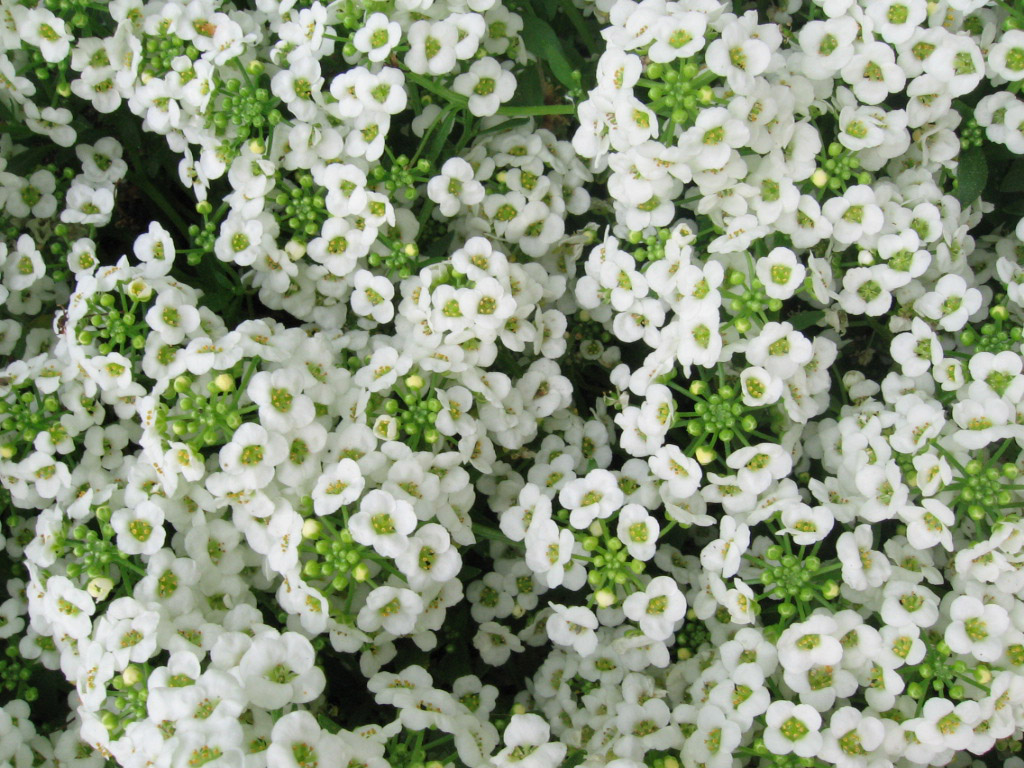
Cultivar 'White Alyssum'

Lobularia maritima (syn. Alyssum maritimum) is a species of low-growing flowering plant in the family Brassicaceae. Its common name is sweet alyssum or sweet Alison, also commonly referred to as just alyssum (from the genus Alyssum in which it was formerly classified).

== Etymology ==
The genus name Lobularia comes from a Greek word meaning 'small pod,' referring to the shape of the fruits; the obsolete Alyssum can be translated as 'lack of madness,' referencing the historical use of the herb as a treatment against rabies. The name of the species maritima refers to its preferred coastal habitat.

== Description ==
Lobularia maritima is an annual plant (rarely a short-lived perennial plant) growing to 5–30 cm (2–12 in) tall by 20–30 cm (8–12 in) broad. The stem is very branched, with dense clusters of small flowers. The leaves are 1–4 cm long and 3–5 mm, broad, alternate, sessile, quite hairy, oval to lanceolate, with an entire margin.

The flowers are about 5 millimetres (0.20 in) in diameter, sweet-smelling, with an aroma similar to that of honey, with four white rounded petals (or pink, rose-red, violet. yellow and lilac) and four sepals. The six stamens have yellow anthers. The flowers are produced throughout the growing season, or year-round in areas free of frost. They are pollinated by insects (entomophily) as its sweet honey-like fragrance is attractive to bees, flower flies, stingless wasps and butterflies. The fruits are numerous elongated seedpods rather hairy, oval to rounded, each containing two seeds. The dispersal of seed is affected by the wind (anemochory).

== Distribution ==
This plant is native to the Mediterranean Basin and the Macaronesia region: (Canary Islands, Madeira, Cape Verde). It is widely naturalized elsewhere in the temperate world, including the United States. There is an endemic subspecies in the local flora of the Columbretes Islands of the western Mediterranean.

== Habitat ==
It is common on sandy beaches and dunes, but can also grow on cultivated fields, walls, slopes and waste ground, preferably on calcareous soil, at an altitude of 0–300 metres (0–984 ft) above sea level.

== Cultivation ==
Lobularia maritima is cultivated in gardens, with many horticultural varieties with purple or pink flowers. The plant is best planted in early spring, but requires little maintenance when growing. Although an annual, it may reseed in temperate climates. It will flower more profusely if spent blooms are trimmed. When grown in gardens, it is typically used as groundcover, as it rarely grows higher than 20 cm (8 in) tall. It is also grown in cracks in paving and walls, and is especially associated with coastal locations. It prefers partial shade, and is highly resistant to heat and drought. Plants with darker-colored flowers do better in cooler temperatures.

=== Cultivars ===
(Those marked agm have gained the Royal Horticultural Society's Award of Garden Merit.)

- 'Snow Cloth' (white)
- 'Royal Carpet' (purple)
- 'Benthamii'
- 'Carpet of Snow'
- 'Easter Bonnet Violet'
- Golf Series agm
- 'Little Dorrit'
- 'Navy Blue'
- 'New Carpet of Snow'
- 'Oriental Nights'
- 'Rosie O'Day' agm
- 'Snow Crystals'
- 'Snowdrift' agm
- 'Sweet White'
- 'Tiny Tim'
- 'Violet Queen' agm
- 'Wonderland Copper'
- 'Wonderland White' agm

== Uses ==
The petals, leaves, and tender stems of the plant can be eaten raw or cooked.

== Gallery ==
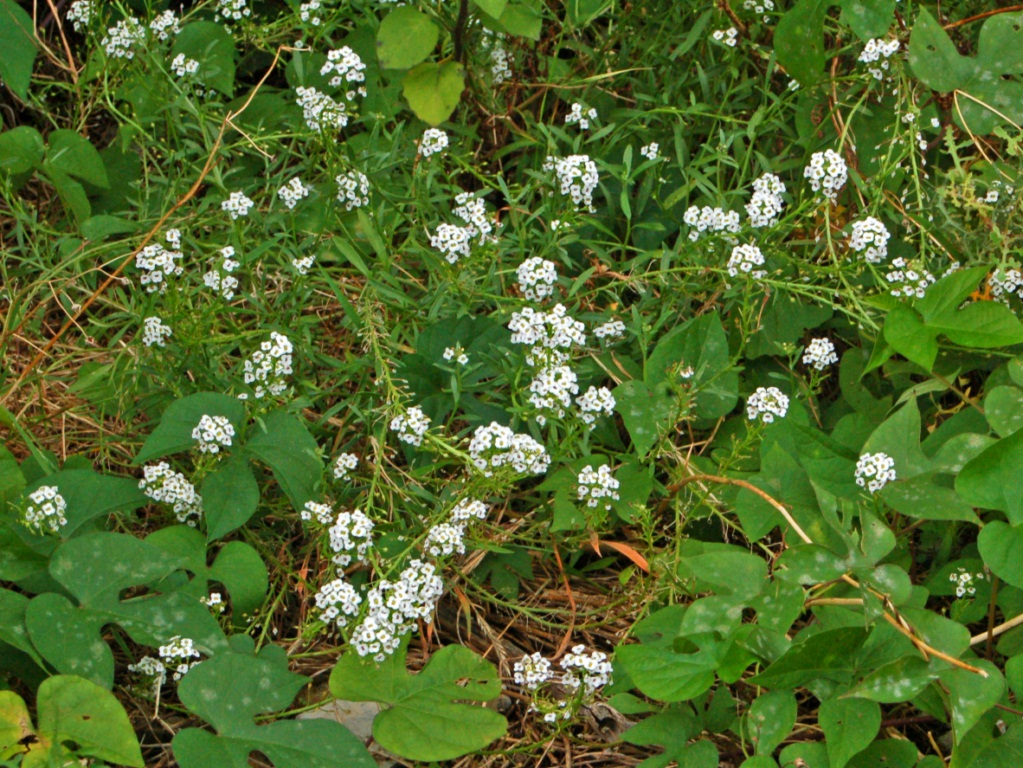
Plants of Lobularia maritima

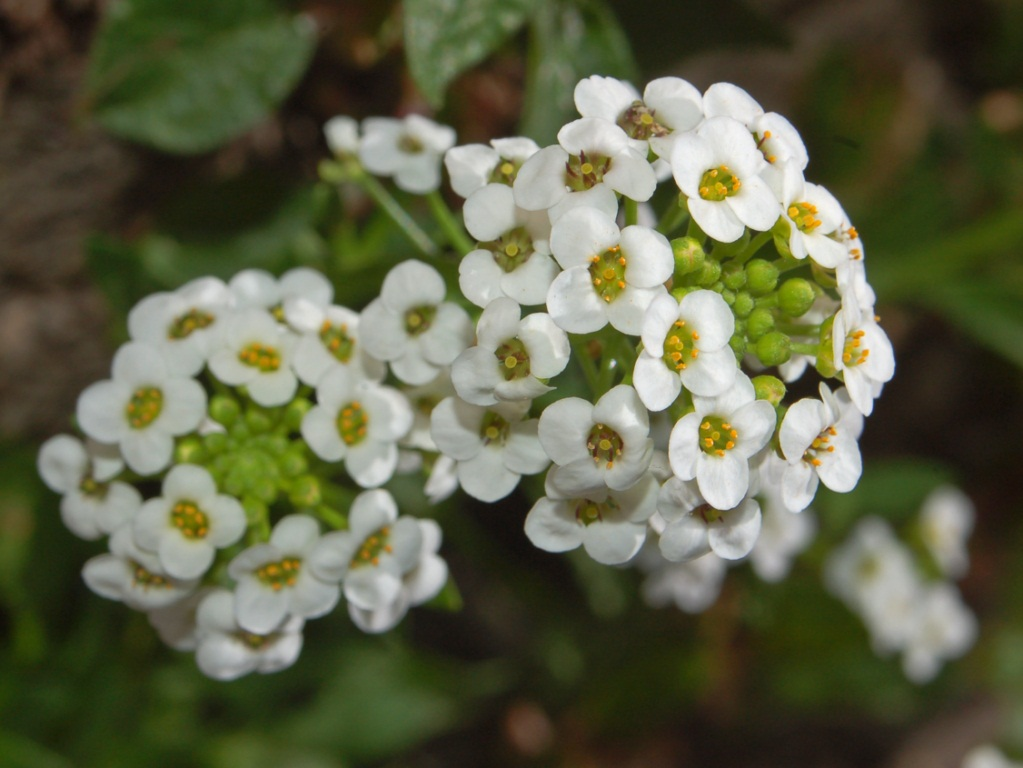
Flowers of Lobularia maritima

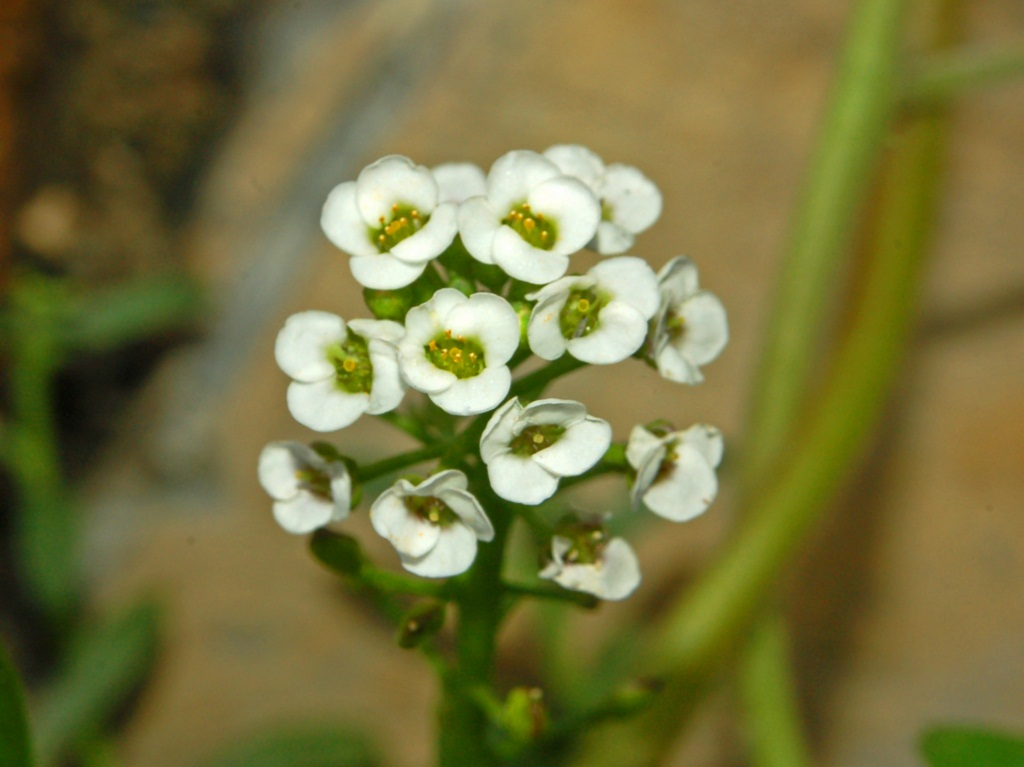
Flowers of Lobularia maritima

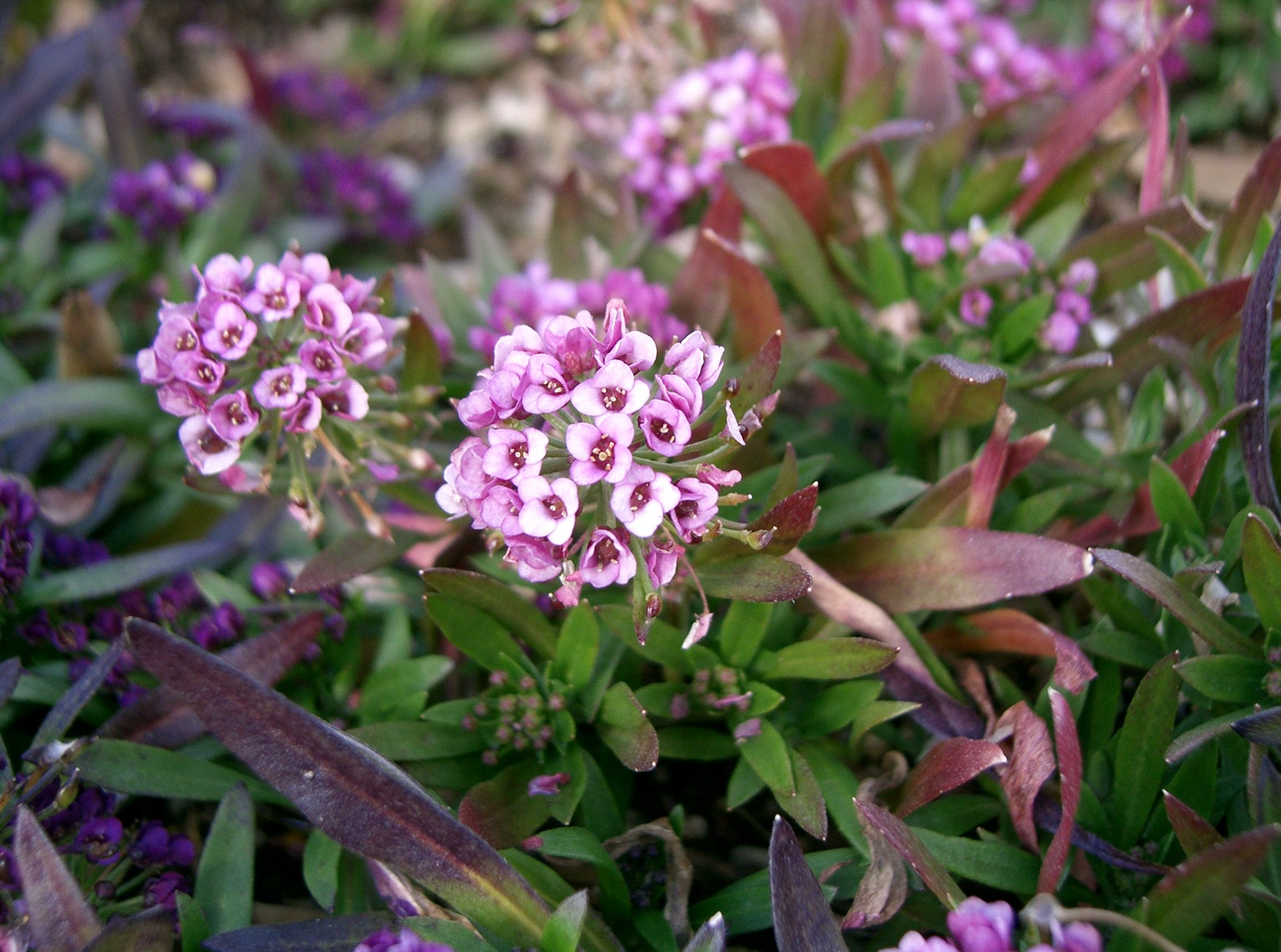
L. maritima, Osaka, Japan

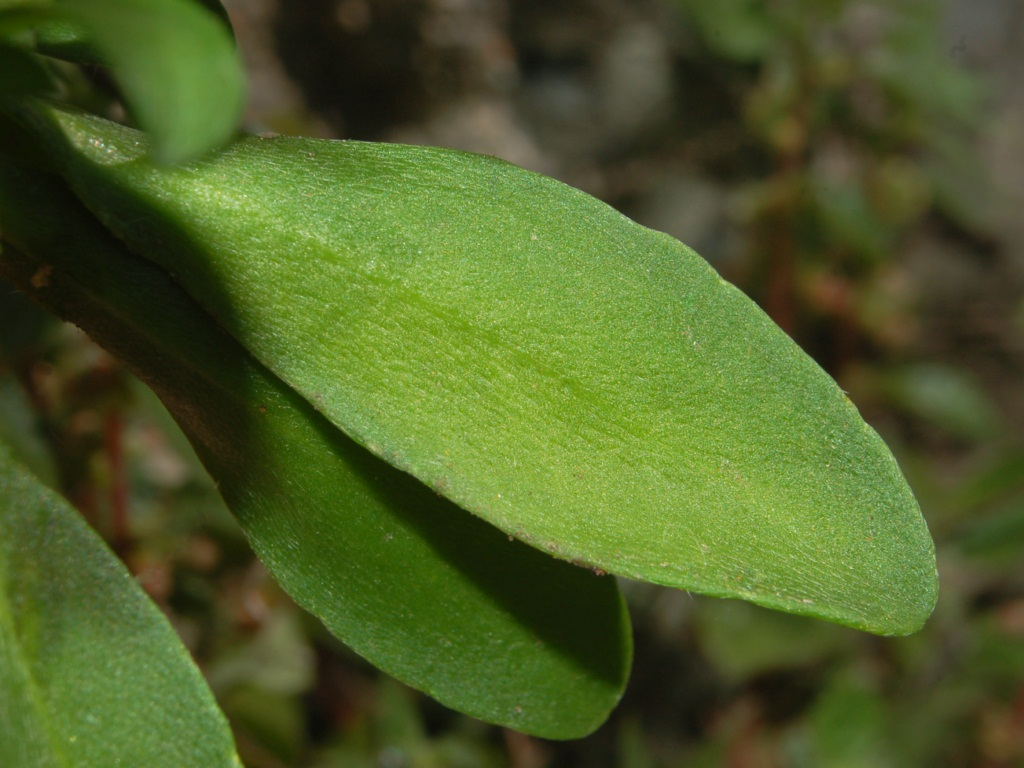
Leaf of Lobularia maritima

== Synonyms ==
- Alyssum maritimum f. argentatum Font Quer
- Alyssum maritimum f. crassifolium Font Quer
- Alyssum maritimum f. densiflorum (Lange) Briq.
- Alyssum maritimum f. densiflorum (Lange) Samp.
- Alyssum maritimum f. virescens Font Quer
- Alyssum maritimum var. densiflorum (Lange) Rouy & Foucaud
- Alyssum maritimum var. genuinum Rouy & Foucaud
- Alyssum maritimum var. lepidoides Ball
- Alyssum maritimum var. macrophyllum Pau
- Alyssum maritimum (L.) Lam.
- Alyssum murcicum Sennen
- Alyssum odoratum hort.
- Alyssum strigulosum (Kuntze) Amo
- Clypeola maritima L.
- Koniga maritima var. densiflora (Lange) Rouy
- Koniga maritima var. genuina Rouy
- Koniga maritima var. strigulosa (Kuntze) Rouy
- Koniga maritima (L.) R. Br. in Denham & Clapperton
- Koniga strigulosa (Kuntze) Nyman
- Lobularia maritima f. densiflora (Lange) Maire
- Lobularia maritima subsp. columbretensis R. Fern.
- Lobularia maritima (L.) Desv. subsp. maritima (L.) Desv.
- Lobularia maritima var. densiflora Lange
- Lobularia strigulosa (Kuntze) Willk. in Willk. & Lange
- Ptilotrichum strigulosum Kunze
