= Deflowering (flowers) =

Removing flowers from plants before they develop

Deflowering is a form of pruning that consists of removing flowers before they develop. It is similar to deadheading but stricter, as deadheading refers to the removal of faded flowers.

Deflowering is usually performed on fruit-forming and seed-forming shrubs and trees in their first year. The aim is to prevent the plants from spending energy and nutrients on seed development before they establish themselves. Leaving some flowers and fruits to develop may be necessary for identification purposes.
