= Container garden =

Practice of growing plants exclusively in containers

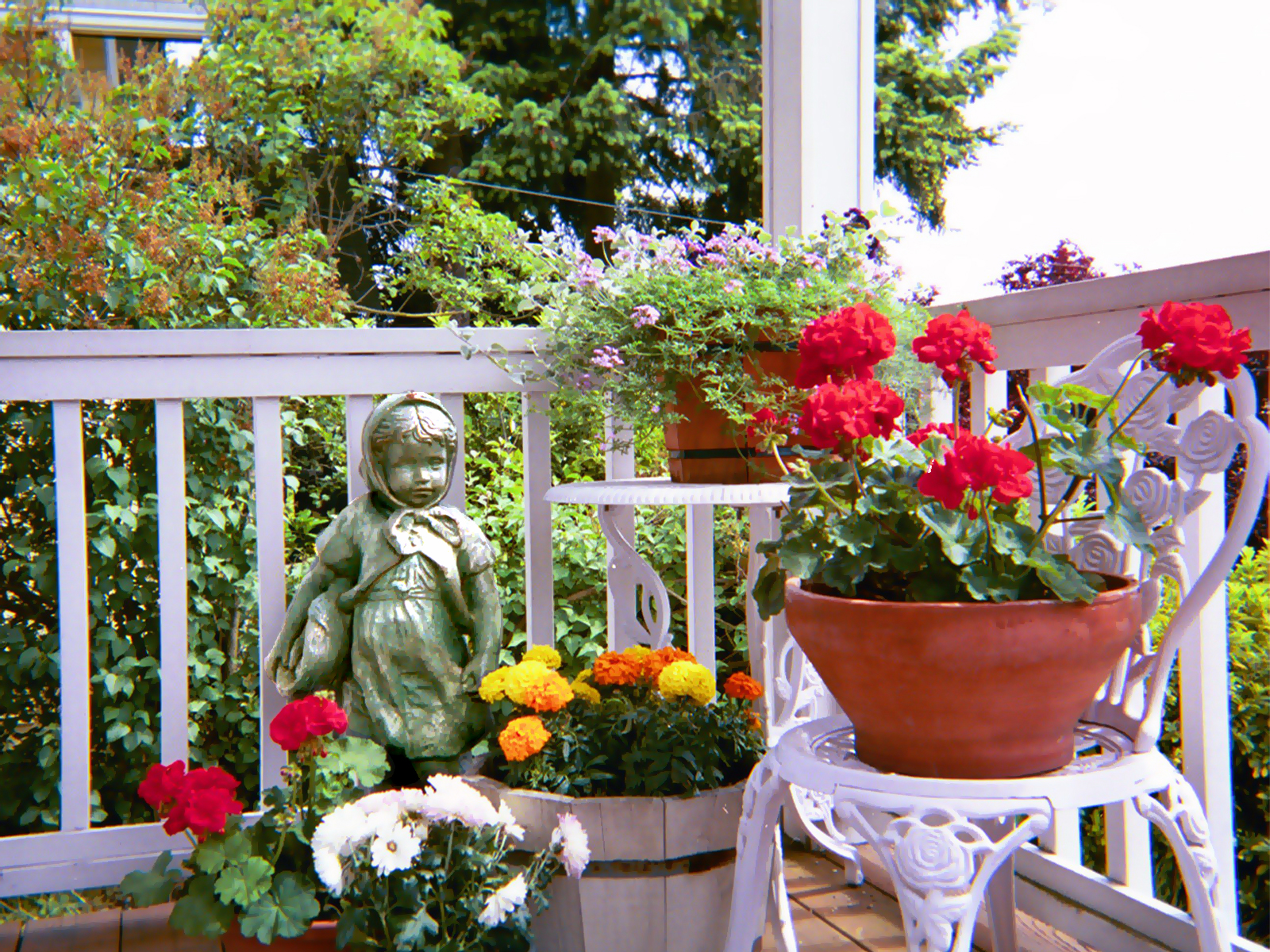
Container garden on front porch

Container gardening or pot gardening/farming is the practice of growing plants, including edible plants, exclusively in containers instead of planting them in the ground. A container in gardening is a small, enclosed and usually portable object used for displaying live flowers or plants. It may take the form of a pot, box, tub, basket, tin, barrel or hanging basket.

== Methods ==
Pots, traditionally made of terracotta but now more commonly plastic, and window boxes are the most commonly seen. Small pots are called flowerpots. In some cases, this method of growing is used for ornamental purposes. This method is also useful in areas where the soil or climate is unsuitable for the plant or crop in question. Using a container is also generally necessary for houseplants. Limited growing space, or growing space that is paved over, can also make this option appealing to the gardener. Additionally, this method is popular for urban horticulture on balconies of apartments and condominiums where gardeners lack the access to the ground for a traditional garden.

== Species ==
Many types of plants are suitable for the container, including decorative flowers, herbs, cacti, vegetables, and small trees and shrubs. Herbs and small edible plants such as chili peppers and arugula can be grown inside the house, if there is adequate light and ventilation, and on outdoor terraces, larger vegetables may be planted.

== Types of containers ==
A wide variety of containers can be used in container gardens, each offering unique benefits and aesthetic qualities. Among the most popular types from a 2024 survey are:

Hanging baskets
Suitable for trailing plants, hanging baskets can be suspended from ceilings, walls, or specially designed stands, adding vertical interest and maximizing space in small gardens.
Window boxes
These containers fit on windowsills, and are suitable for flowers, herbs, and small vegetables.
Wall planters
Mounted on walls, these planters can be used for vertical gardening. They come in various designs, including pockets and shelves, making them suitable for a range of plant types.

Other common container options include traditional pots, which vary in material from terracotta to plastic, and sub-irrigated planters. Containers can also be repurposed items such as barrels and tins, allowing for creative and personalized garden designs.

== Planting ==
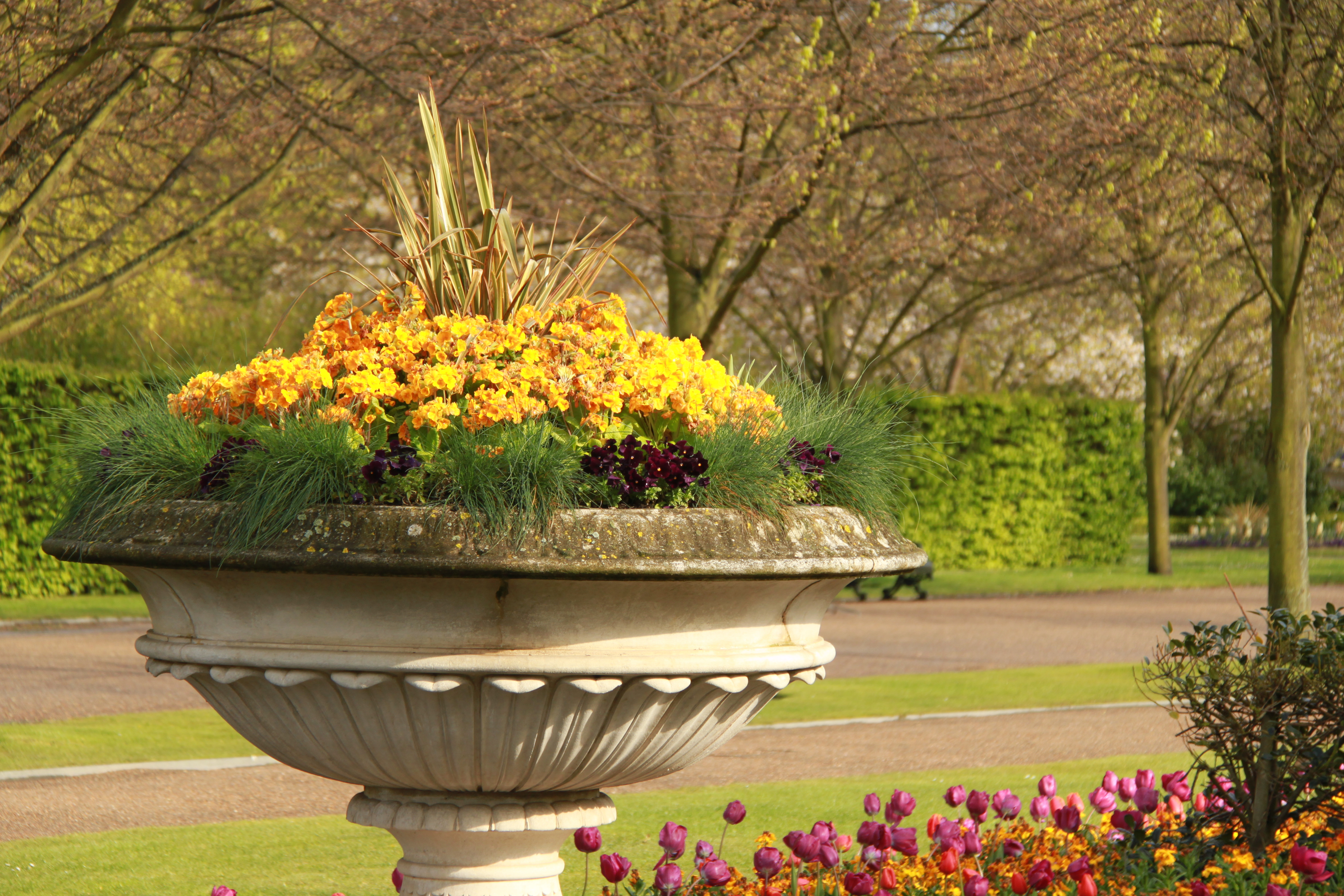
An ornamental planter at Regent's Park, Inner London, England

Containers range from simple plastic pots, to teacups, to complex automatically watered irrigation systems. This flexibility in design is another reason container gardening is popular with growers. They can be found on porches, front steps, and—in urban locations—on rooftops. Sub-irrigated planters (SIP) are a type of container that may be used in container gardens.

== Re-potting ==
Re-potting is the action of placing an already potted plant into a larger or smaller pot. A pot that fits a plant's root system better is normally used. Plants are usually re-potted according to the size of their root system. Most plants need to be re-potted every few years because they become "pot-" or "root-bound". A plants' roots can sense its surroundings, including the size of the pot it is in, and increasing the pot size allows plant size to increase proportionally.

== Gallery ==
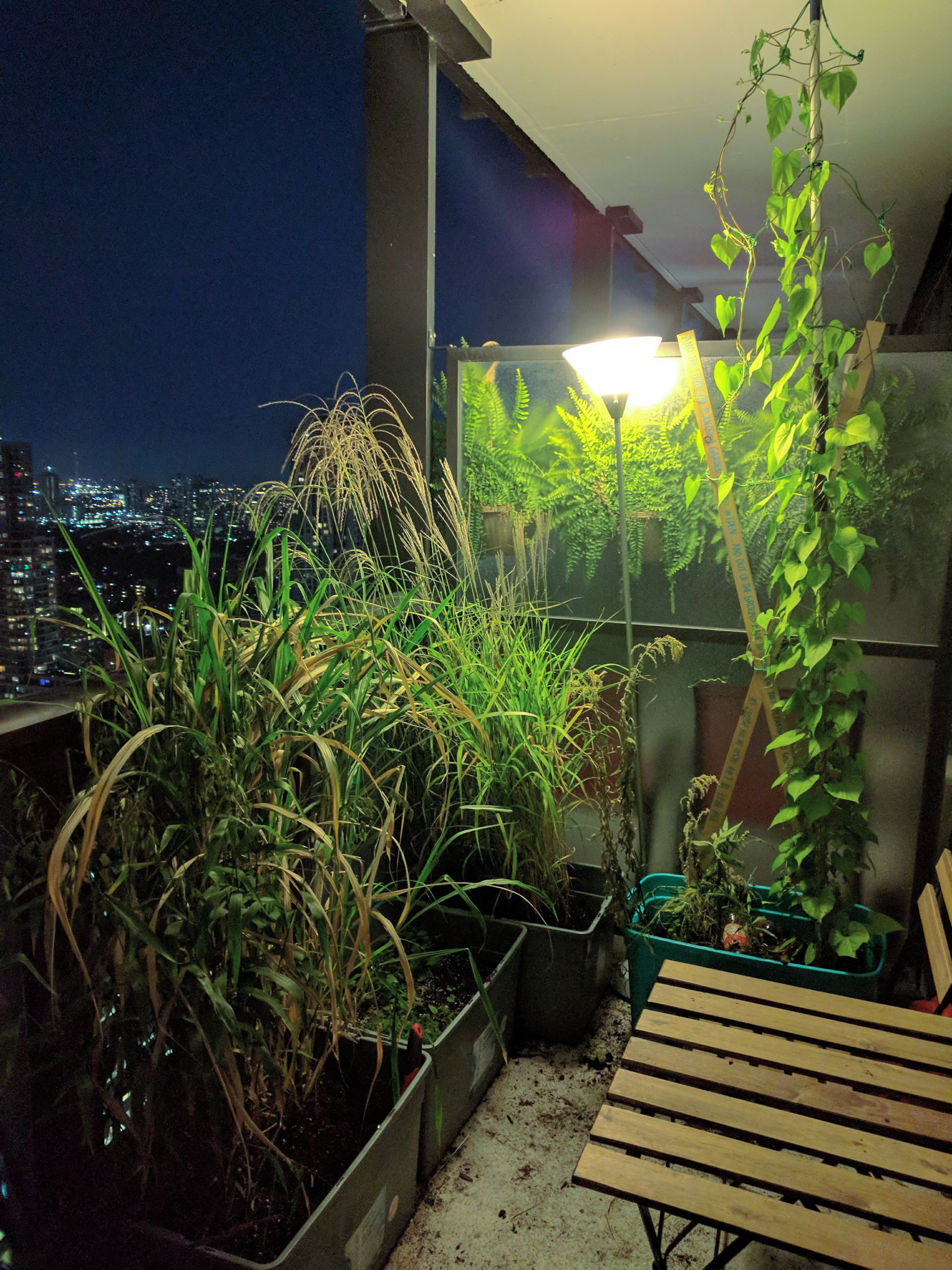
Balcony gardening at night

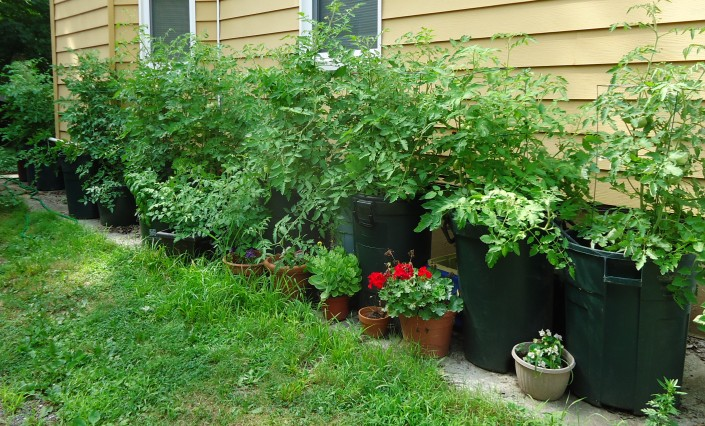
Tomato plants growing in a pot farm alongside a small house in fifteen garbage cans filled with soil

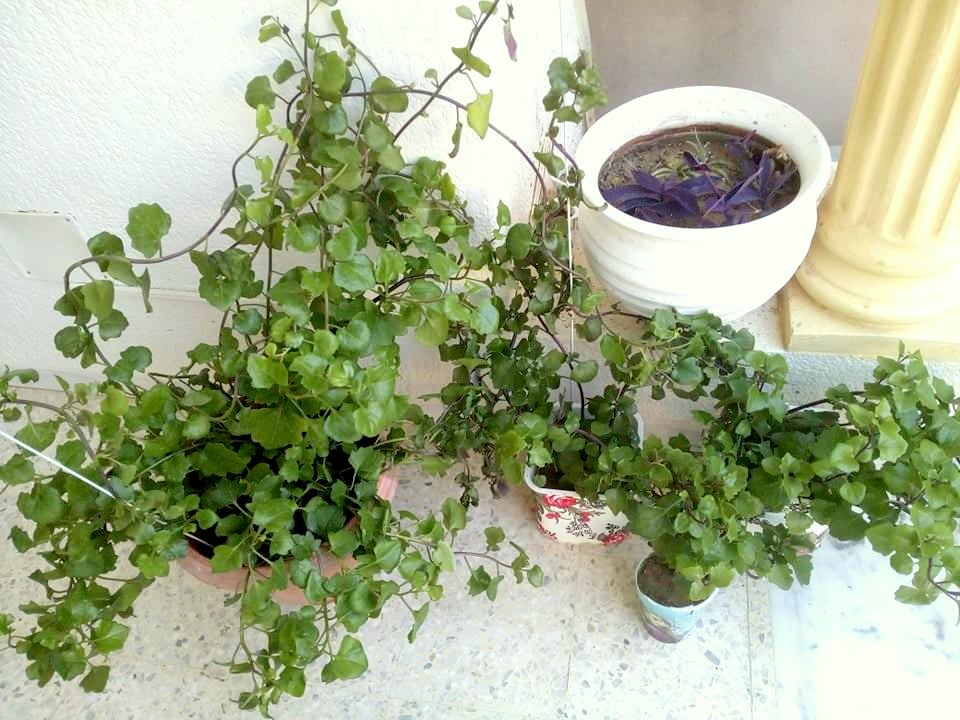
Senecio angulatus growing in clay and plastic pots on a veranda

== See also ==
- Dutch flower bucket
- List of garden types
- Seedling
- Urban compost
