= Hanging basket =

Suspended container used for growing decorative plants

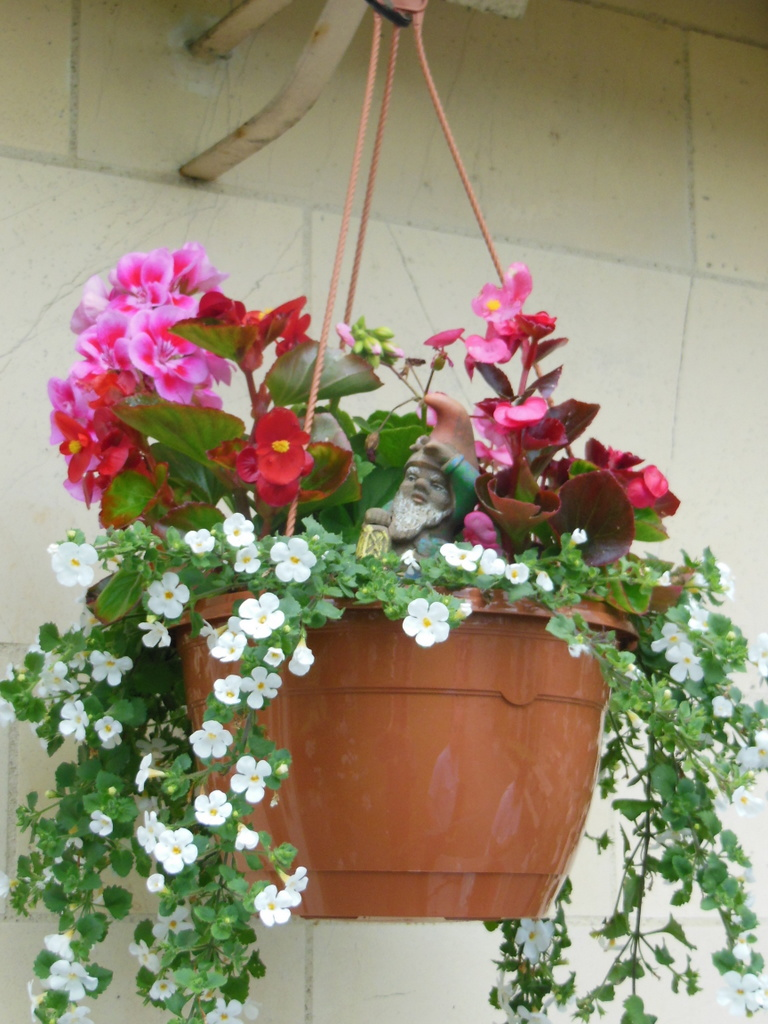
A hanging basket in Yarm, England

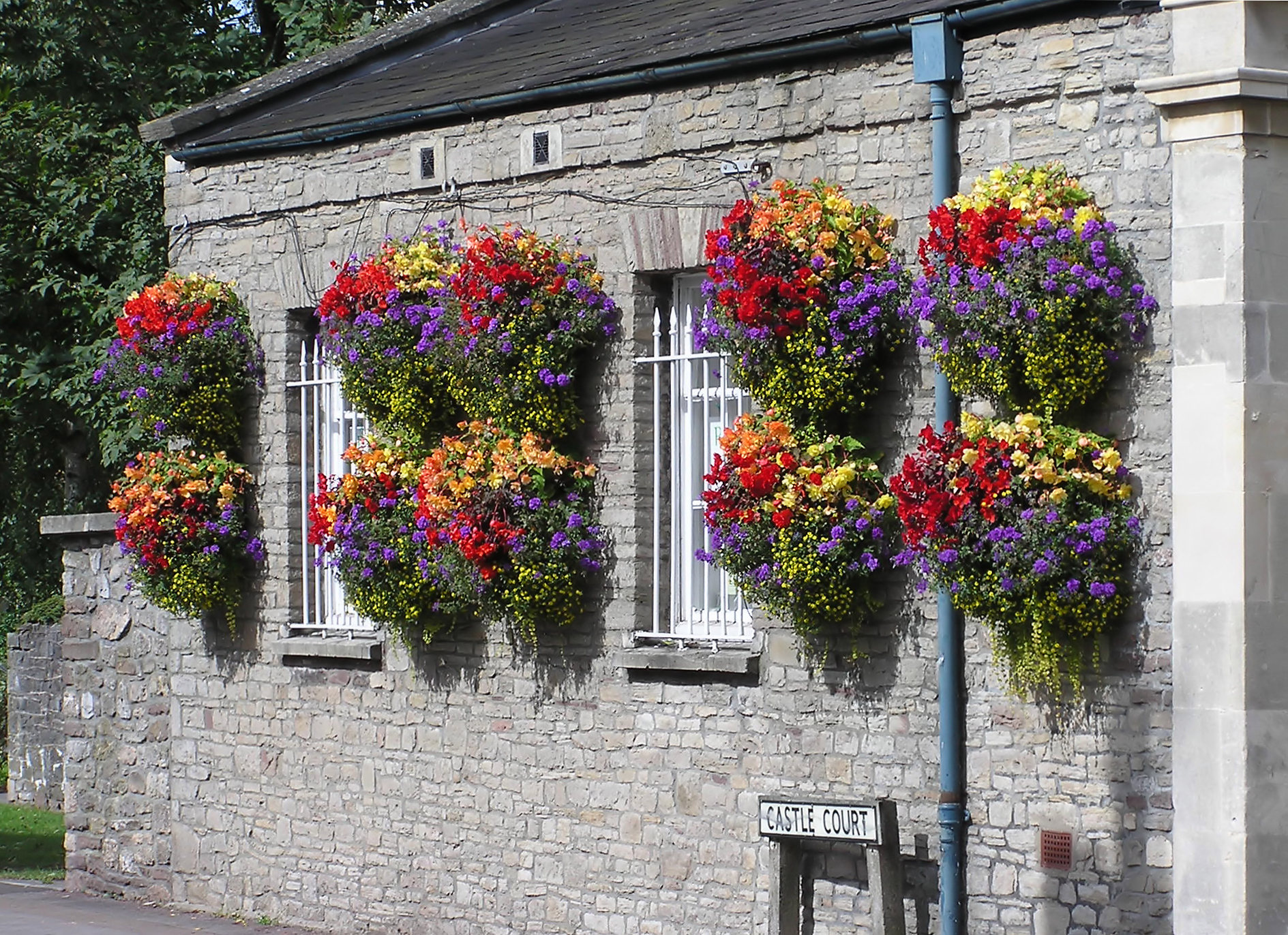
Hanging baskets in the town of Thornbury, England

A hanging basket is a suspended container used for growing plants. The purpose of hanging baskets in ornamental horticulture is to display plants suspended in the air to add to the aesthetics of the environment. Hanging baskets can vary by the choices of basket material, support system, plant selection, and how the plants are maintained. The installation of hanging baskets can also impact the design of the hanging basket. The concept of having hanging baskets in a space can be both beneficial and problematic, especially when used in community settings. In the industry of commercial greenhouse operations, hanging baskets have their production method compared to other crops grown. There are many communities globally that display hanging baskets to add to the area’s aesthetic.

== Earliest Historical Record ==
The earliest reference to hanging baskets in history is referenced to the hanging gardens of Babylon. These seven wonders of the ancient world are said to inspire the hanging baskets we create today.

== Materials ==
=== Basket Options ===
The basket suspended in the air can vary in size and material. Based on industry standards, baskets being made entirely of plastic is a cost-effective choice for garden centers to sell to residential. Plastic is also said to be less appealing, and some people prefer a more natural look, hence the use of moss or coco fiber material instead. Another popular material for the basket that is seen as a professional style for hanging baskets is a combination of wire cages with an artificial or natural liner inside holding the soil media. Other options like wood, ceramic, and terracotta do exist for hanging baskets but are not recommended as they lack water retention compared to using plastic or moss. The size of the basket varies in addition to the material the basket is made from. Baskets are judged based on diameters with the small size ranging from 12 to 14 inches, while the classification of a large hanging basket can be 17-20 inches.

=== Soil Type ===
The soil type inputted into the basket can also impact the performance of the plants in the hanging basket. The chosen media must be able to adjust the pH to the correct range, contain a wetting agent, and have sufficient pore spaces, allowing the ease of water and air to flow.

=== Size ===
The size of the hanging basket can have an impact on the plants growing in the basket. There can be a correlation between the soil volume and the length of time your basket will stay in high performance during Its season. The lower the soil volume, the harder the plant's survival in the basket could be.

=== Support System ===
The support system for hanging baskets is important to the sustainability of the hanging basket being suspended in the air. A common sight in cities and municipalities is the hanging baskets hanging from lampposts and hooks attached to buildings. The possibilities for installing hanging baskets in places are endless but it is crucial the structure can support the weight of the hanging basket and support the suspension, especially in outdoor environments where extreme weather events can occur.

== Methods of Installment ==
The appearance of a hanging basket once the plants grows in can depend on the choices made installing the plant matter. The selection of plants and their growing behavior can impact the look as well but the placement of the plants on the basket can also affect the look. A common practice is to place plants on the topsoil surface of the basket but there are other planting strategies to try. Using a liner or moss that can be cut into to create small pockets in the sides of the basket make a planting space. This results in creating a larger, rounder appearance with very little of the original basket structure showing. Another method of installation is the inverted planter style. The basket is hanging upside down but plants are still suspended from the basket.

== Maintenance ==
=== Watering ===
An important aspect of maintaining a hanging basket Is the frequency of watering. Hanging baskets typically need more frequent watering than a garden bed. Environmental factors like low/high light levels, cooler/hotter temperatures, and exposure to wind can impact the frequency of watering. There are many methods for watering a hanging basket. From simply hand watering with a hose to installing an irrigation system or plunging the entirety of the basket in water. Each of the methods mentioned can be effective but it varies by the environment the hanging basket is displayed or grown in. The hanging basket must have drainage holes and only be watered if the top of the basket is dry to the touch. Usually, signs the hanging basket has retained enough water are evident when water starts seeping out the drainage holes. A recommended irrigation method that’s hands-free is drip irrigation which is beneficial for water conservation, can be set on a timer, and delivers water directly to the soil.

=== Fertilizing ===
The fertilizing of the plants in the hanging basket is crucial to the maintenance of the hanging basket. Slow or controlled-release fertilizer is suggested to be added right after buying or assembling the basket. Once the plants have established and the hanging basket is in midsummer, it is suggested to start adding a water-soluble fertilizer once every one to two weeks. If the hanging basket experiences heavy rainfall and a lot of water passes through the basket, fertilizer application is recommended as the rain can wash out the fertilizer from the basket.

=== Pinching & Deadheading ===
Hanging baskets growing through the season on display can sometimes need maintenance activities like deadheading or pinching. The look of dead flowerheads is aesthetically displeasing and by deadheading, it can extend the blooming period of an annual plant for example. Not allowing the plant to put energy into seeding and instead spend the energy on new blooms. Pinching the plants by a few inches in mid to late summer encourages branching, creating a tight concentrated look of the plants, the preferred aesthetic characteristic in hanging basket design.

== Commercial Greenhouse Production ==
Hanging baskets that are produced in greenhouses are aim to be ready for mid-May after the threat of frost is gone. In the Northeast United States, vegetable farmers use vertical space in their high tunnels to produce hanging baskets. Studies show hanging baskets above the crops does not impact the outcome of the yield of the vegetable crops significantly. This has been demonstrated with a tomato crop grown with hanging baskets of petunia grown above. Farmers can be hesitant to grow a flower and vegetable crop together due to the risk of insect damage and disease occurring. Vertical space is also utilized above benches or floor space in the greenhouse for hanging baskets. Studies suggest that hanging baskets in a greenhouse could impact the crop co-habiting the space by limiting growing space and compromising light conditions.

== Plant Selection Recommendations ==
The success of an aesthetically pleasing hanging basket relies heavily on the selection of plants. A hanging basket is a restrictive growing space, and the selection must consider growing habits that allow the plant to thrive in a limited space. The typical plants for hanging baskets show growing behaviors like trailing and mounding. Foliage and flower color can also impact the plant selections for the baskets. Based on geographical locations, different plants could suit hanging baskets better but a list of plants for North America is mentioned.

Plant Suggestions for Hanging Baskets:

- Acalypha
- Alternanthera
- Angelonia
- Bracteantha
- Coleus
- Cuphea
- Iresine
- Lamium
- Lamiastrum
- Plectranthus
- Duranta
- German Ivy
- Helichrysum
- Perilla
- Tradescantia
- Strobilanthes
- Begonia
- Dichondra
- Petunia
- Calibrachoa
- Lobularia
- Impatiens
- Lobelia
- Lantana
- Pelargonium
- Euphorbia
- Nemesia
- Scaevola
- Verbena
- Calylophus

== Benefits & Criticisms ==
Hanging baskets do raise safety concerns with the risk of their support system failing and becoming a danger to the public. In February 2004, Suffolk County Council ruled there was a risk that baskets, part of the annual summer floral displays in Bury St Edmunds, could fall from lampposts and injure the public. Hanging baskets also require a huge amount of water compared to other garden displays and that can be problematic if the area is experiencing drought. Outdoor water-use restrictions were enforced by local authorities in Southeast England resulting in reduction of the number of hanging baskets in public displays in the spring of 2006.

The main reason hanging baskets are used today is to greater a community’s aesthetic by being displayed on the outside of buildings or in the middle of streets on lampposts. The production of hanging baskets employs horticulture technicians to design, install, and maintain them. The hanging basket can occupy vertical growing space not just in greenhouses but in displays, adding depth and greenery to the hard-edge infrastructure around it.
