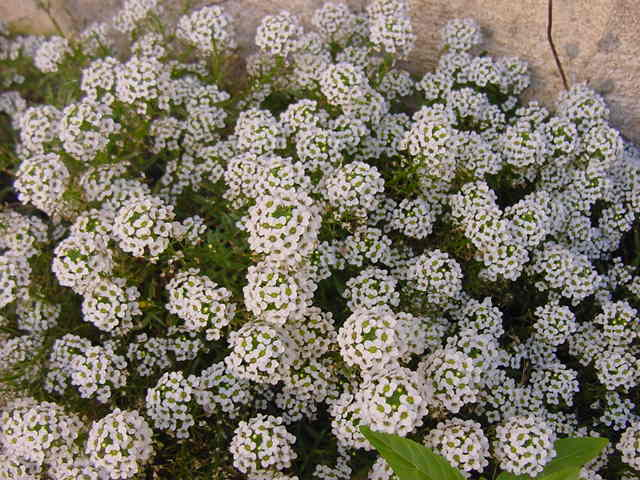
- Lobularia maritima

Scientific classification
- Kingdom: Plantae
- Clade: Tracheophytes
- Clade: Angiosperms
- Clade: Eudicots
- Clade: Rosids
- Order: Brassicales
- Family: Brassicaceae
- Genus: Lobularia; Desv.

Species
- See text

Synonyms
- Glyce Lindl.; Koeniga Benth. & Hook.f.; Konig Adans.; Koniga R.Br.; Octadenia R.Br. ex Fisch. & C.A.Mey.

= Lobularia (plant) =

Genus of flowering plants

Lobularia is a genus of five species of flowering plants in the family Brassicaceae, closely related to (and formerly often included in) the genus Alyssum. The genus is native to Macaronesia, the Mediterranean region, Iran, and Saudi Arabia, and comprises annuals and perennials growing to 10–40 cm (4–16 in) tall, with hairy oblong-oval leaves and clusters of cross-shaped (cruciform), fragrant white flowers.

The name Lobularia derives from the Greek for a small pod, referring to the fruits.

== Species ==
Four species are accepted.

- Lobularia arabica (Boiss.) Muschl.
- Lobularia canariensis (DC.) L.Borgen
- Lobularia libyca (Viv.) Meisn.
- Lobularia maritima (L.) Desv.

== Cultivation and uses ==
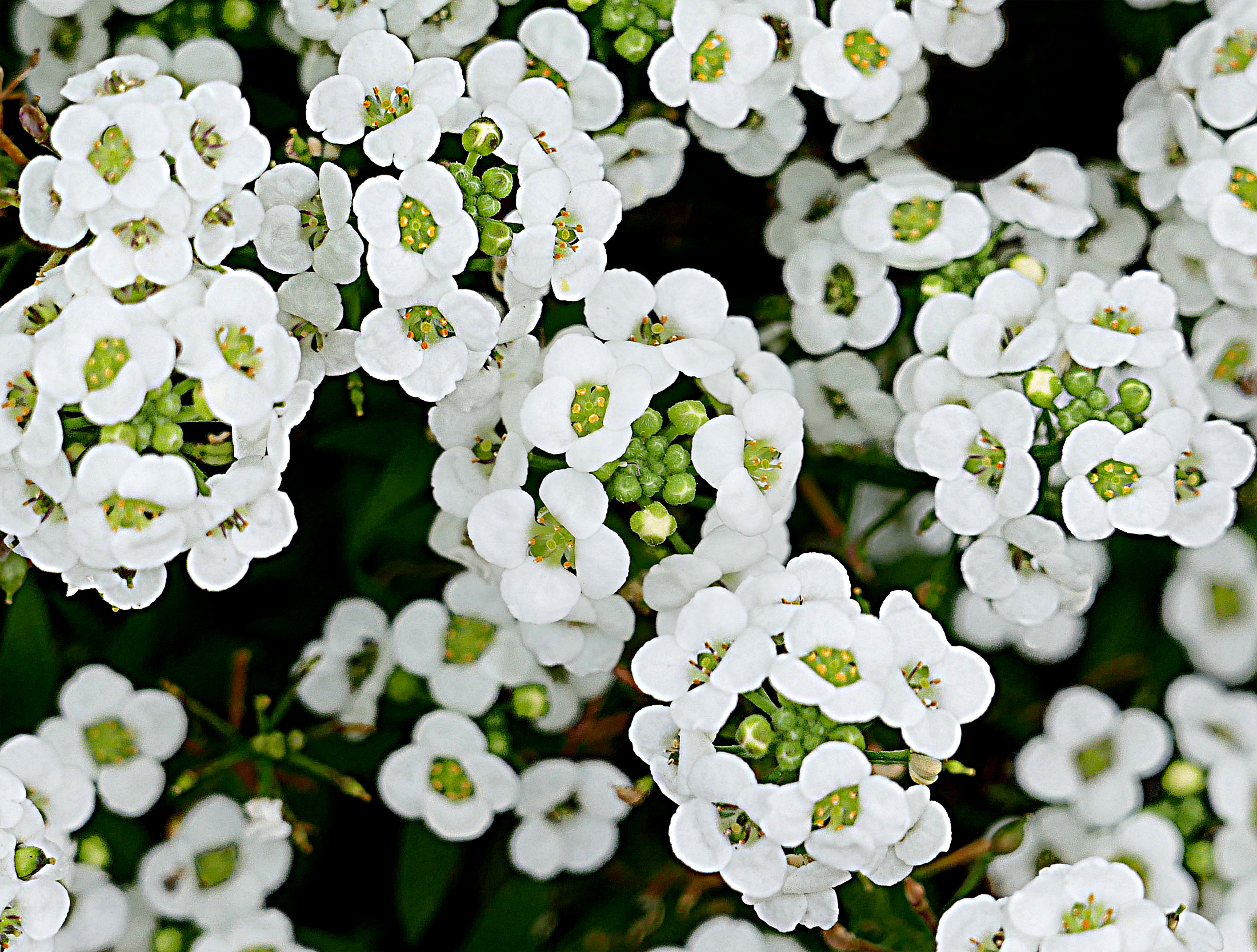
Sweet Allysum -- Lobularia maritima

Lobularia maritima (sweet alyssum; syn. Alyssum maritimum) is a very popular garden plant; it has become widely naturalised throughout the temperate world.
