= Windowfarm =

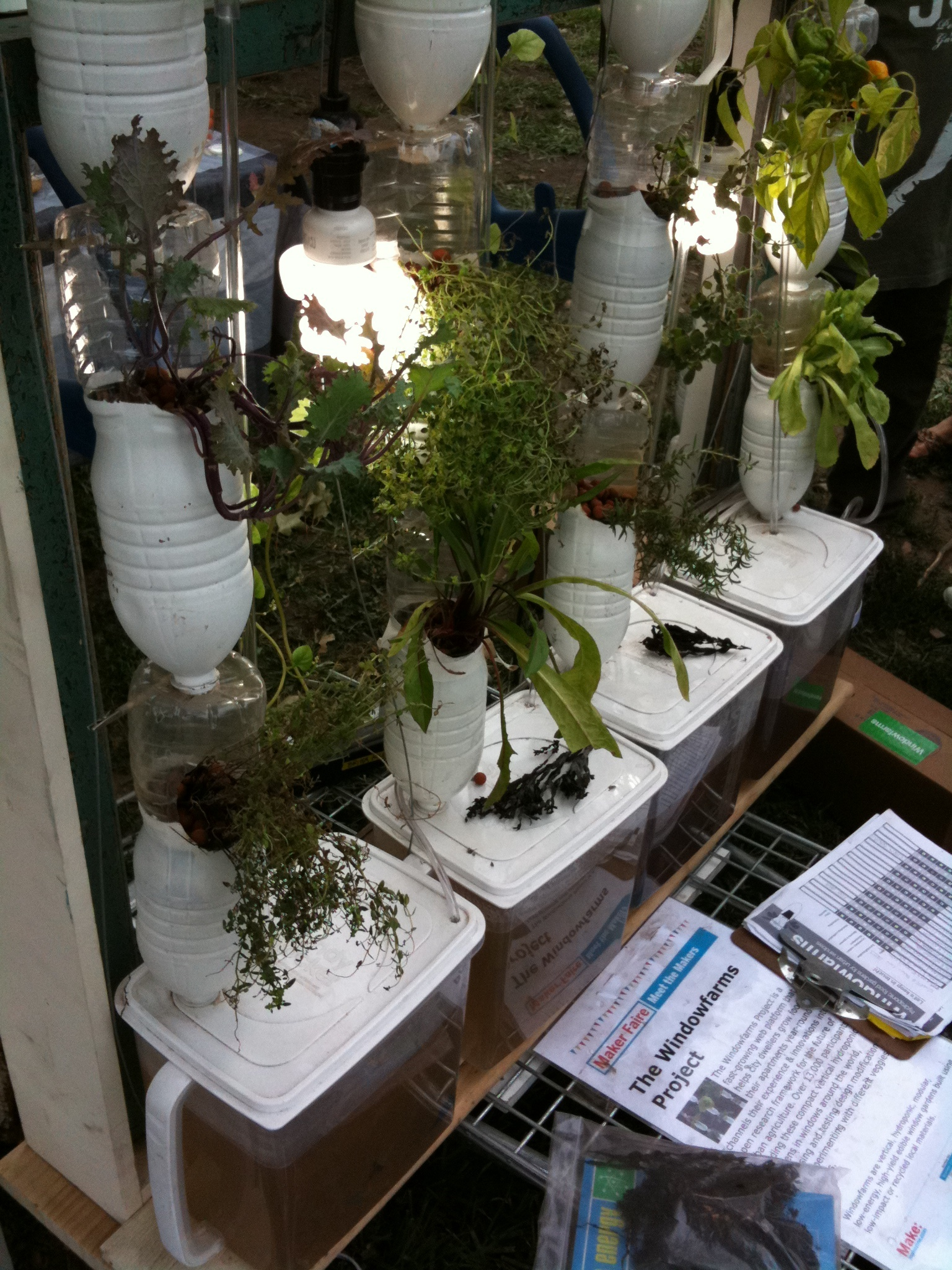
A windowfarm setup

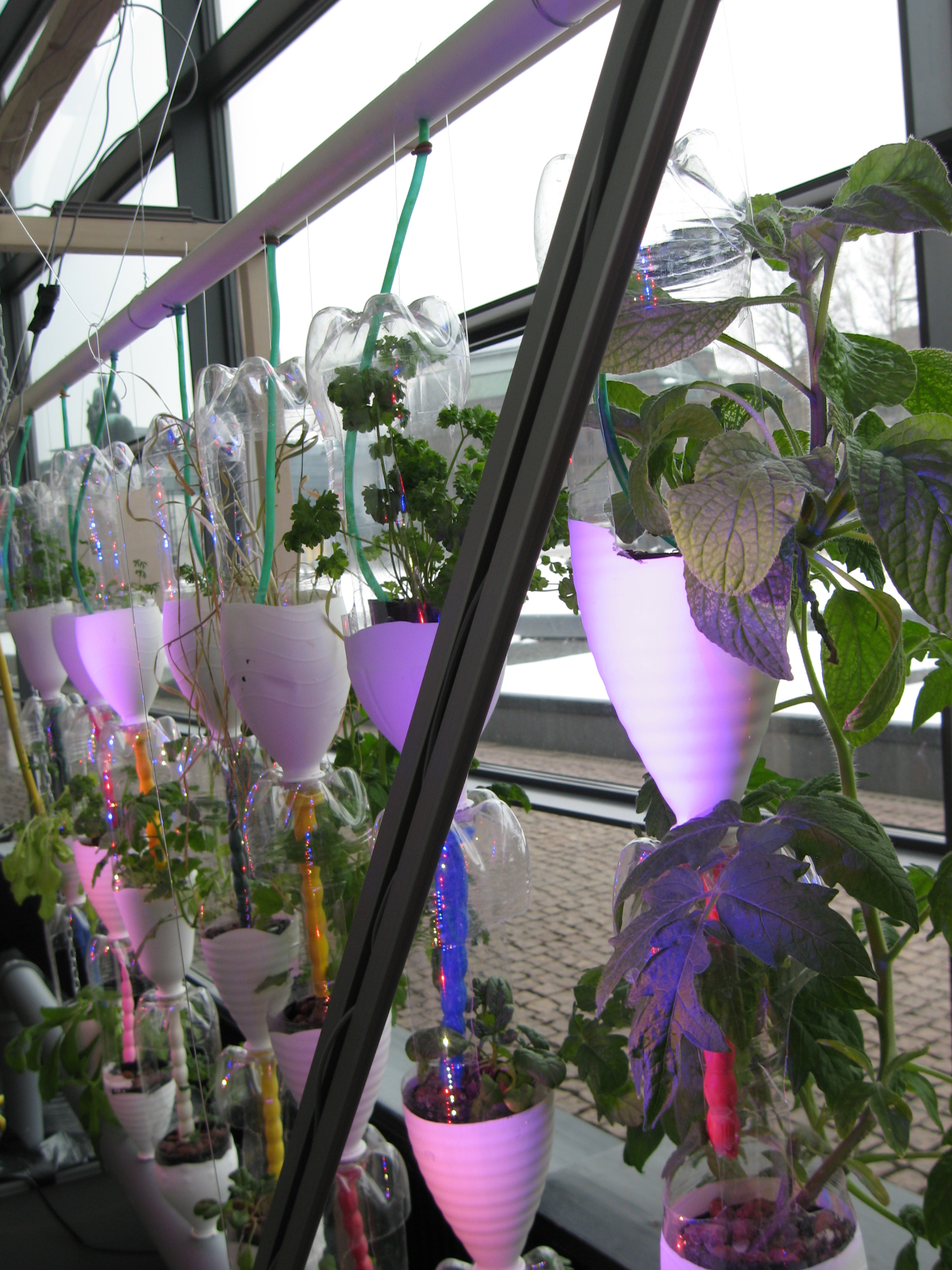
A windowfarms setup

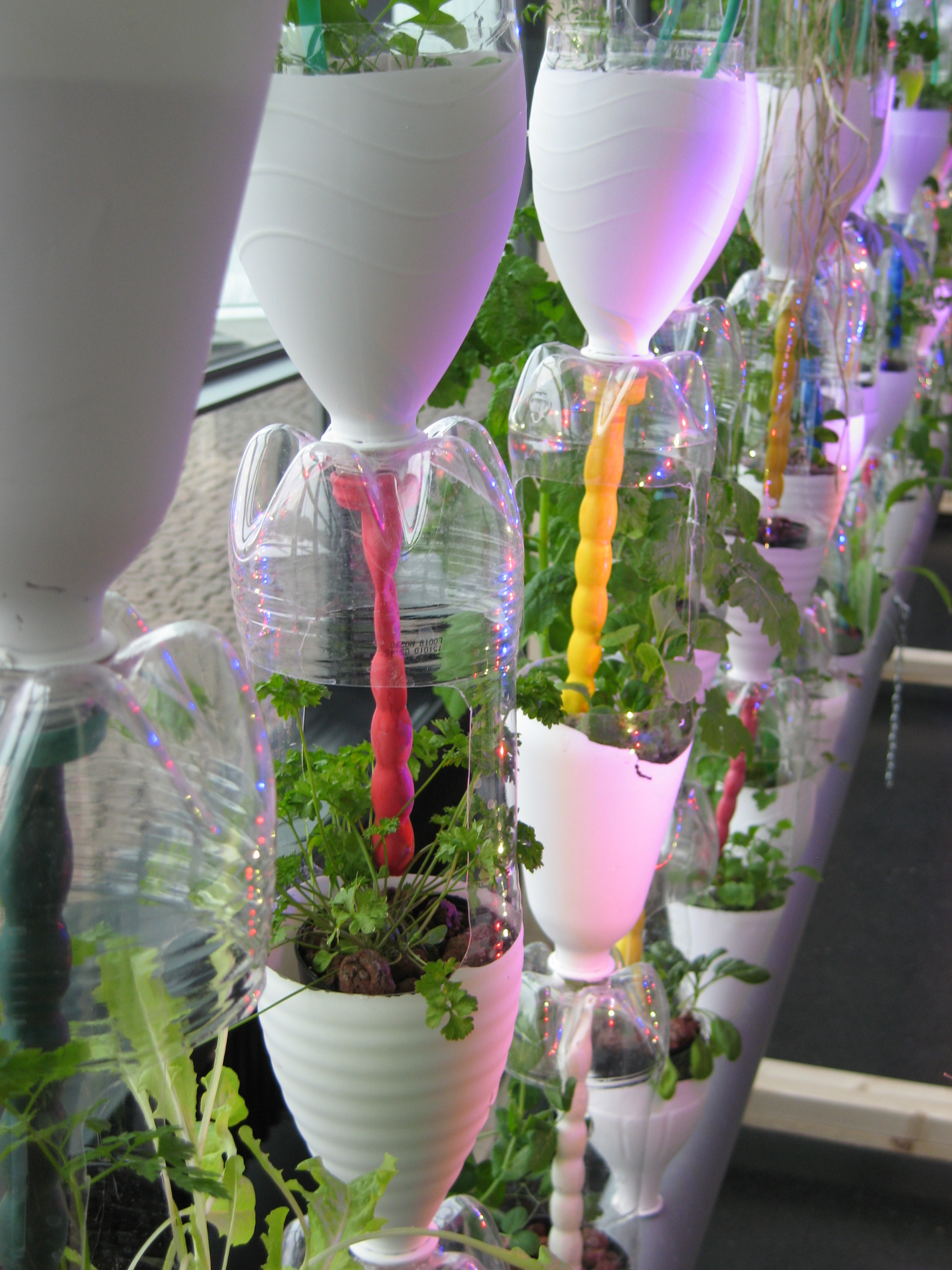
A windowfarms setup

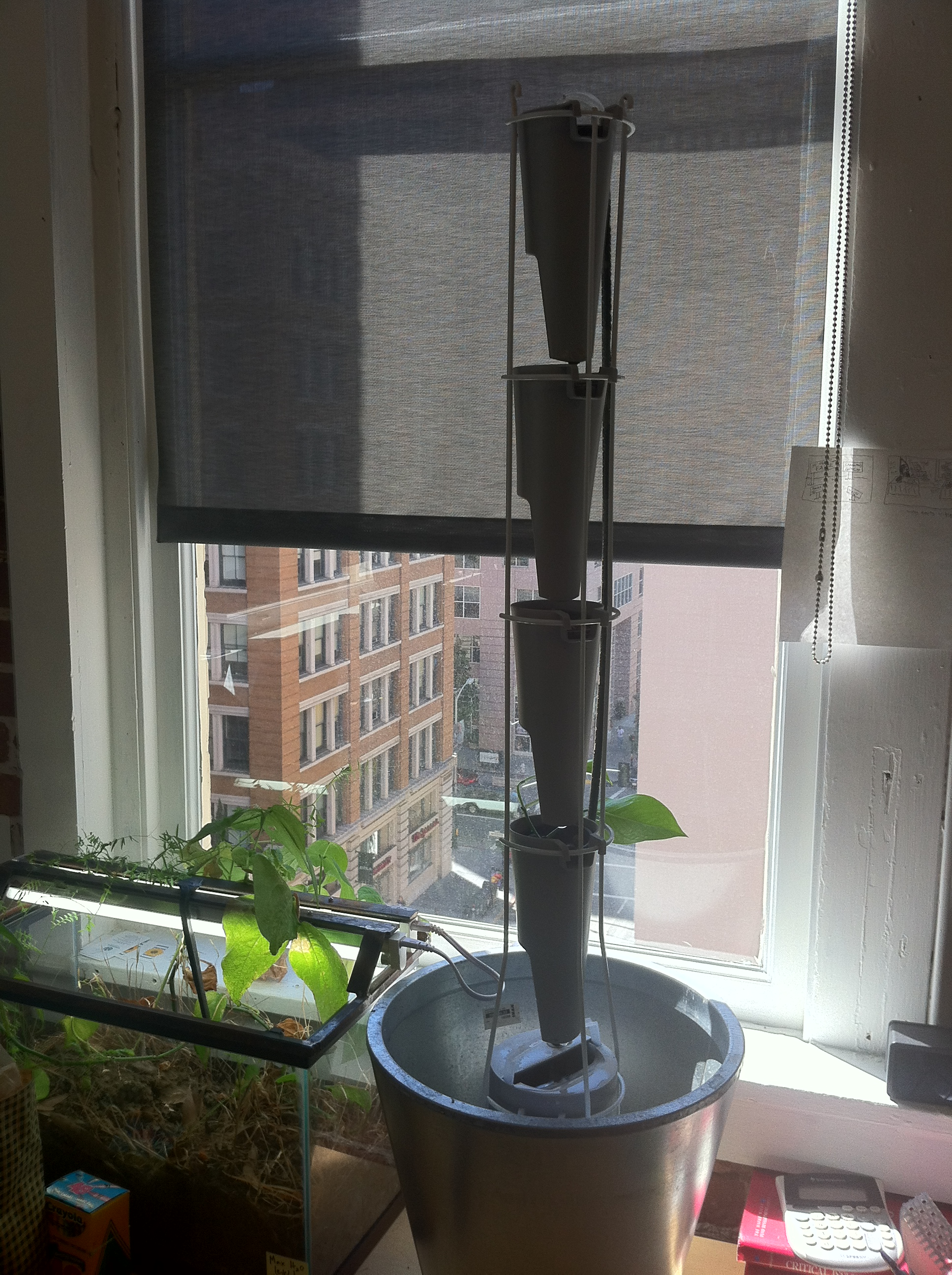
A windowfarm (unplanted) in an office window

A Windowfarm is a hydroponic urban gardening system. It is an indoor garden that allows for year-round growing by windows using natural light, climate control, and organic soil. It was originally developed by Britta Riley using open-source designs and was manufactured by Windowfarms from 2009 to 2016.

== History ==
Windowfarms was a Brooklyn, NY-based social enterprise that made vertical indoor food gardens.

In 2009, founder Britta Riley built the first Windowfarm with friends in her 5th floor Brooklyn apartment window. She collaborated to open and crowdsource the development of a home hydroponic food growing system for apartment windows, building a now defunct social media sharing site, around a set of instructions for making the systems out of repurposed water bottles and plumbing supplies. The site now has nearly 40,000 registered users who have built Windowfarms. Through two Kickstarter campaigns, the social startup raised over $285,000 to manufacture Windowfarms in the United States.

One year after funding succeeded on their second campaign the WindowFarm team made a final update to the Kickstarter project page, announcing domestic orders fulfilled.

Windowfarms was commissioned to build two large arrays of Windowfarms at The American Museum of Natural History in conjunction with the globe-traveling special exhibition on food, “Our Global Kitchen: Food, Culture, Nature“. The LED grow light powered hydroponic research garden was on view for 10 months at the Columbus and 79th street entrance November 2012-August 2013.

July 2013, CBC News published an article explaining how Canadian and international backers feel ripped-off by Britta Riley, co-founder of the Windowfarms. A Netherlands-based part of the community wrote an open letter to Riley, asking her to contact them.

As of December 31, 2016, debtors, investors, and former employees received a notice that "Windowfarms is going out of business and will not be able to make good on its outstanding balance on your invoices. The company will be fully dissolved by the end of the fiscal year 2016 and does not have sufficient assets to offset this and other debts."

== Function ==
In the hydroponic system, nutrient-spiked water is pumped up from a reservoir at the base of the system and trickles down from bottle to bottle, bathing the plants’ roots along the way. Water and nutrients that are not absorbed collect in the reservoir and will be pumped through again at the next interval. Plants grown in soil have roots that extend far and wide, but hydroponically grown plants roots are hairy and dense, which is used to preserve space.
