= Front yard =

Portion of land between a street and house

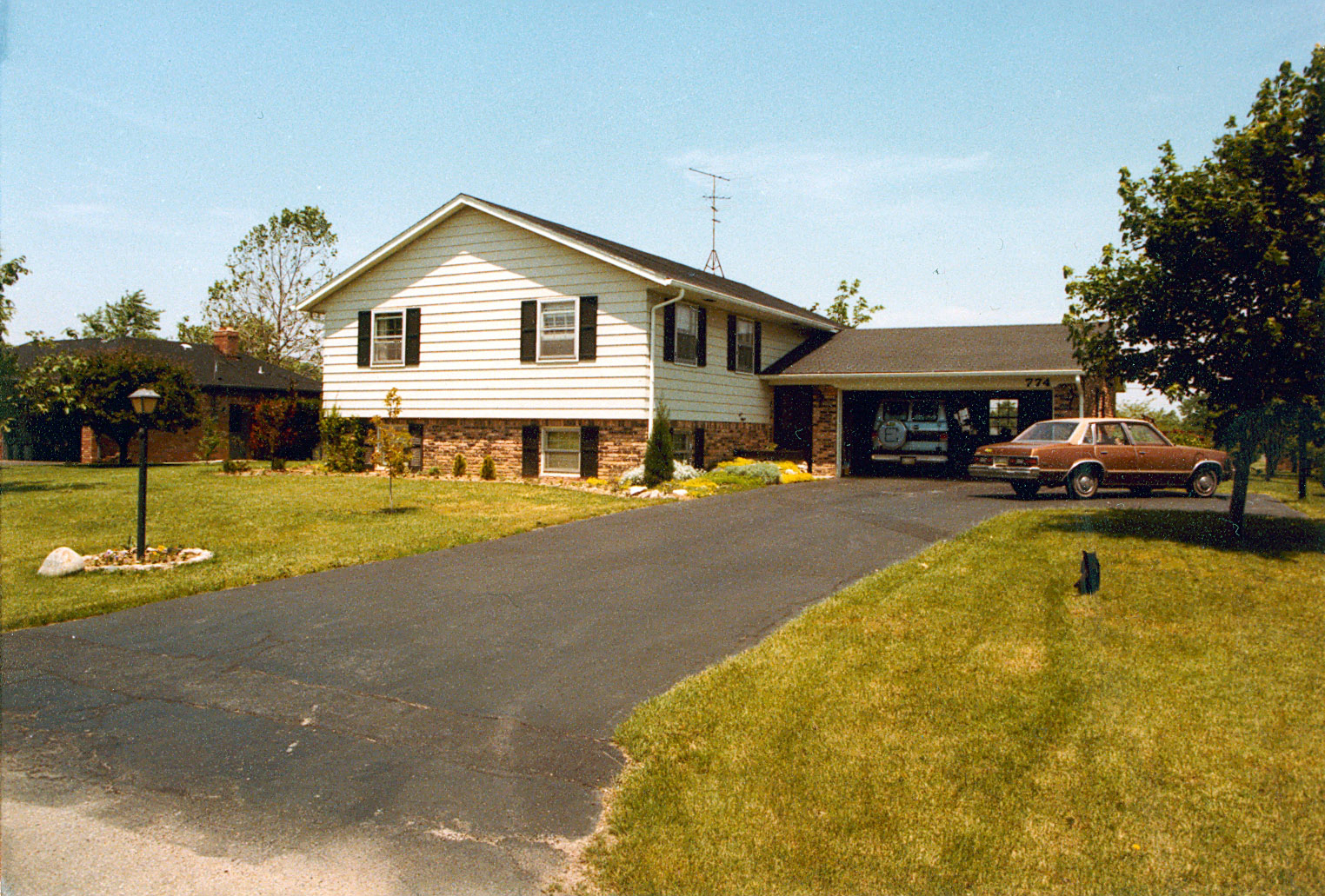
A typical suburban front yard in mid-1980s Greenwood, Indiana, United States.

On a residential area, a front yard (United States, Canada, Australia) or front garden (United Kingdom, Europe) is the portion of land between the street and the front of the house. If it is covered in grass, it may be referred to as a front lawn. The area behind the house, usually more private, is the back yard or back garden. Yard and garden share an etymology and have overlapping meanings.

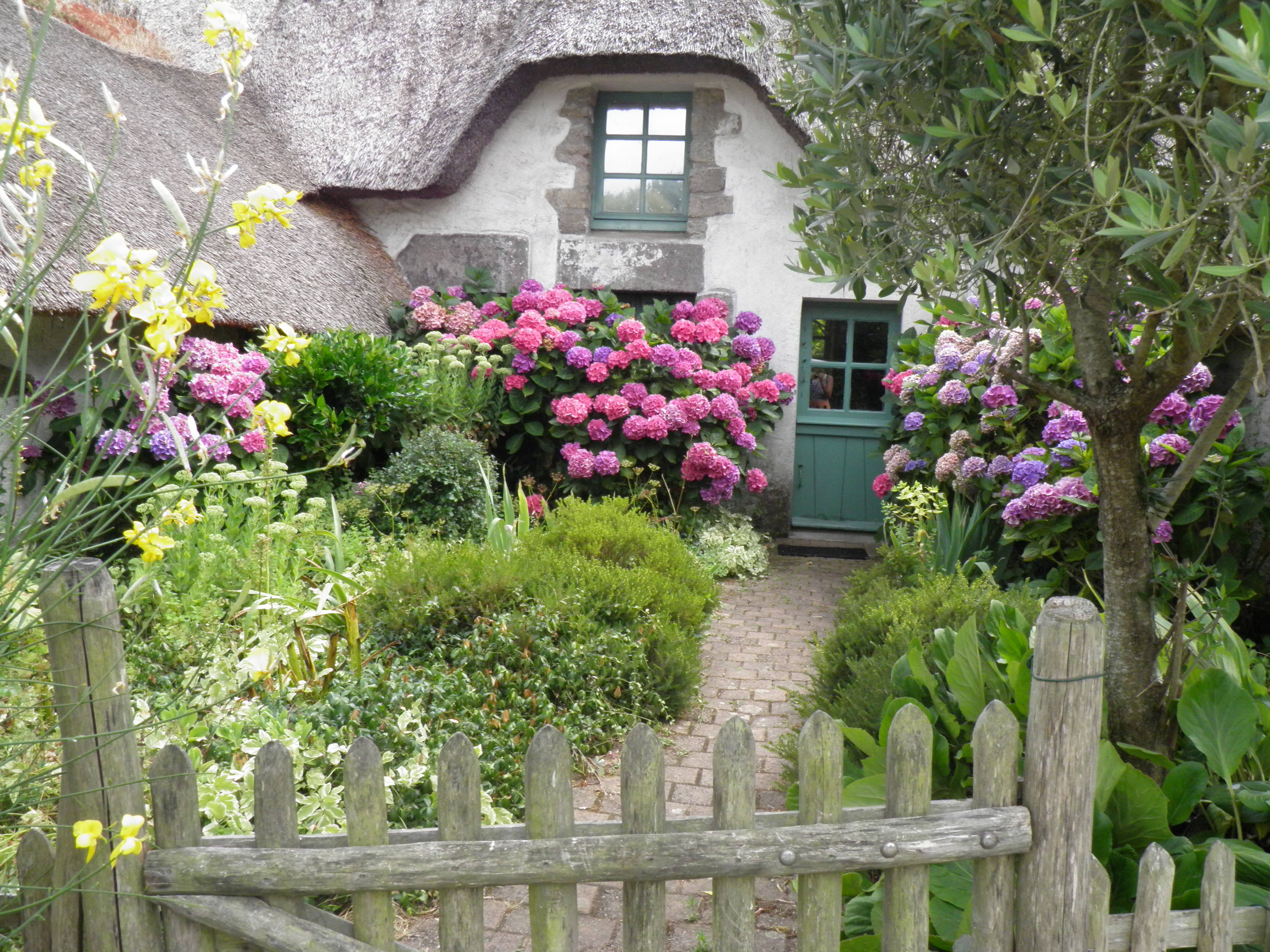
Front garden in France

In North America, front yards, which normally include considerable driveway and parking space, tend to be mostly lawn even when large, but in Europe they are often treated as a flower garden and may be heavily planted. In North American suburbia, there may be no physical barriers marking the front and sides of the plot, which would be very unusual in Europe, where there are generally walls, fences or hedges on three sides of the garden.

== Features ==
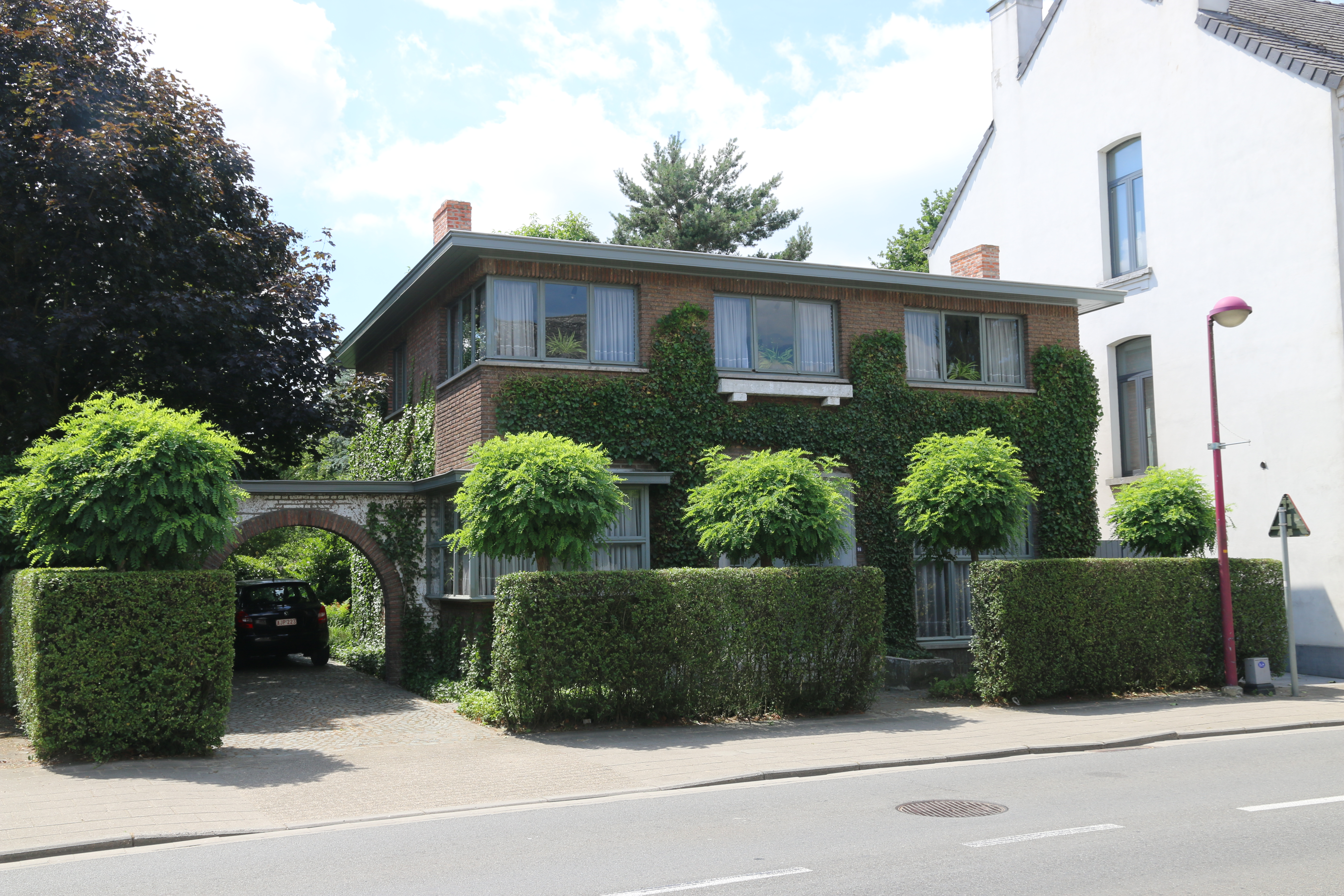
Front garden in Belgium

While the front yard's counterpart, the backyard, is often dominated by utilitarian features like vegetable gardens, tool sheds, and clothes lines, the front yard is often a combination decorative feature and recreation area. It is more commonly landscaped for display and is the usual place for display elements such as garden gnomes, plastic flamingos, and yard shrines such as "bathtub Madonnas". An article on London suburbs describes a "model" front garden in Kenton: "The grass ... is neatly mown. There is a flowering cherry and a privet hedge, behind which lurks a plaster gnome."

Depending on climate, local planning regulations or size, a front yard may feature a lawn or grassed area, a driveway or footpath or both and gardens or a vegetable patch or potted plants.

== History and styles ==
=== Australia ===
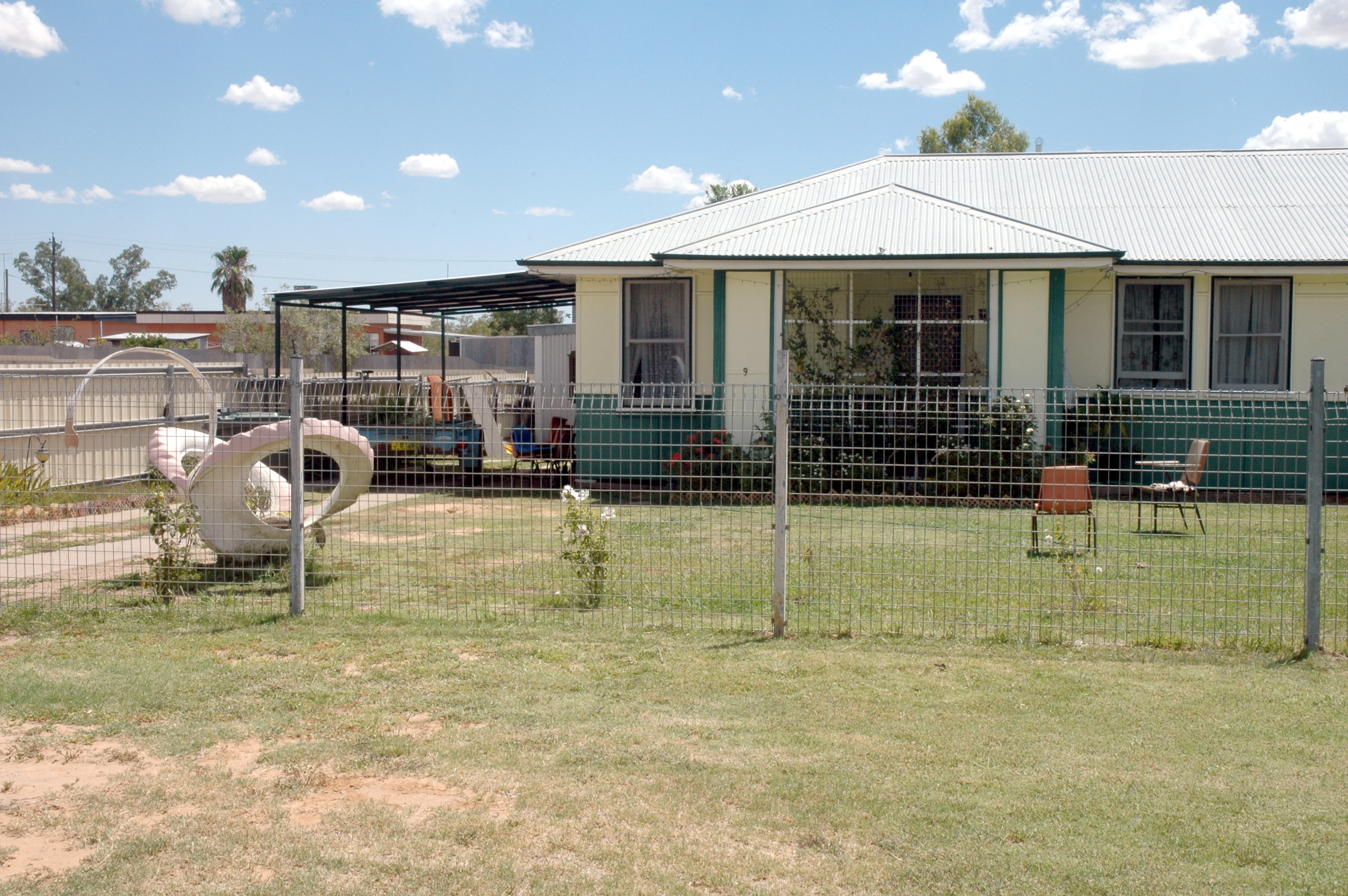
The fenced front yard of a house in Brewarrina, Australia, with an Australiana painted-tyre-swan lawn ornament.

The history of the Australian front yard is said to have begun with a regulation enacted in New South Wales in 1829 mandating that new houses be built at least 14 ft (4.3 m) from the street to ensure adequate space in front of each house for a garden.

By the early 1900s, the front yard had become an accepted, "buffer between the private home and the public street". Australians adopted the American ideal of front yards without fences to create "park-like" streets and suburb-wide efforts were undertaken to remove fences and thereby encourage good neighbourly relationships and discourage anti-social behaviour and crime. Daceyville in Sydney was the first suburb where fencing was systematically removed and soon public housing organisations in other states followed the trend. Some even encouraged front yard beautification by running competitions with cash prizes.

During the construction of Australia's planned capital, Canberra, (in the late 1920s) the Federal Capital Commission provided government subsidies to encourage new residents to regularly maintain their front yards.

By the 1950s, there was a clear delineation between front and back yards. There was also, by then, a very clear street-view approach to garden design with the house façade and front yard considered in unison; to "view the whole effect from the street".

=== Canada ===
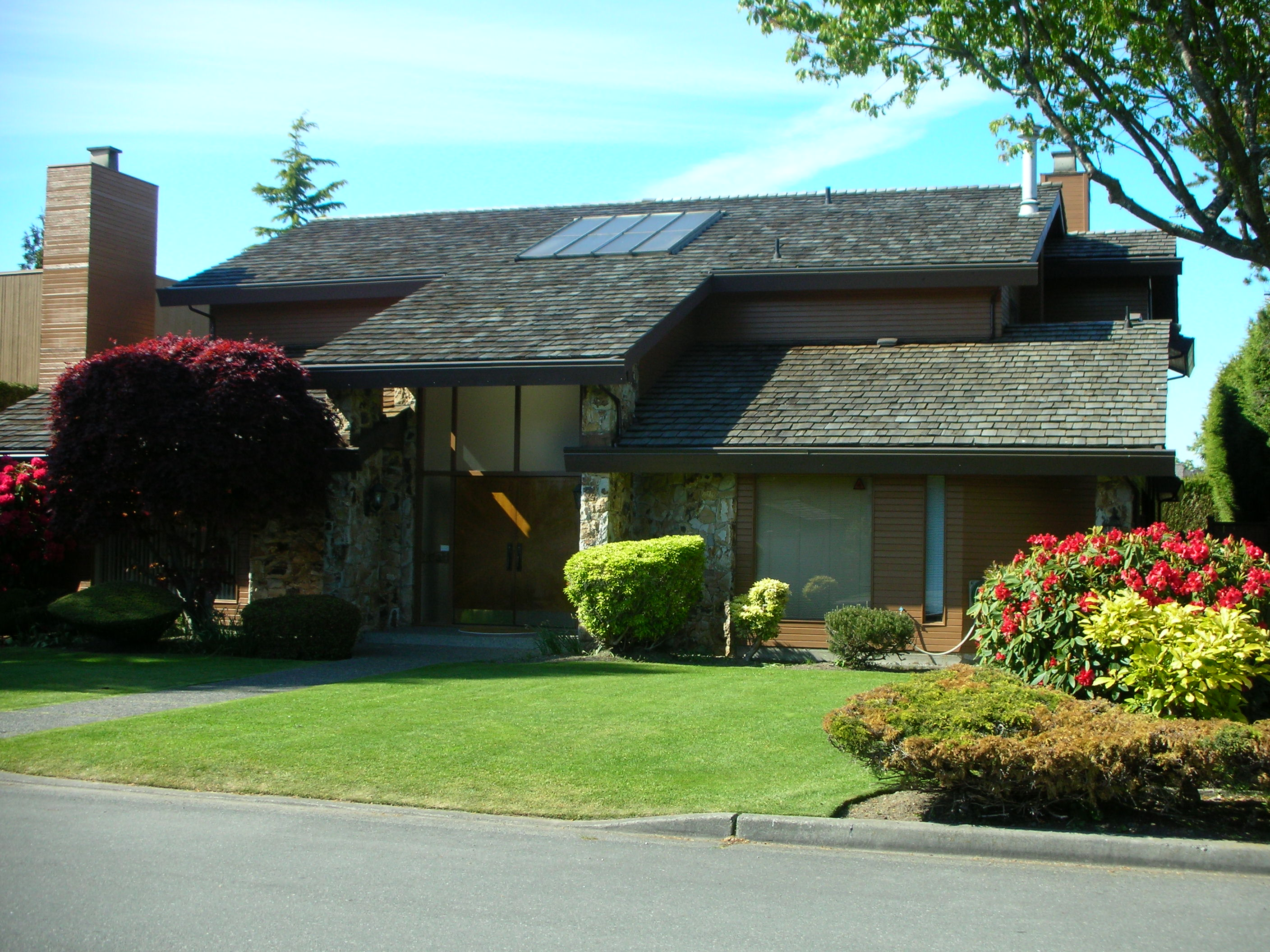
A 1970s-built home with cedar panelling and a front yard with a large section of lawn and a tall-tree border in Richmond, British Columbia.

The development and history of Canadian front yards generally followed early American trends but diverged in the early 1900s.

In the 1920s and 30s, zoning laws were introduced for growing cities like Ottawa and Vancouver. The regulations stipulated minimum front yard "depth" for new houses and ensured home builders shunned the "tenement house evil" of New York City and London.

In many parts of Canada, lower average temperatures and a more pronounced want for privacy led to the increased popularity of tall trees at the side borders of housing blocks, framing the house and front yard. These provided wind breaks in winter and shade in the summer. Lawn ornaments were less common in pre and post-war Canada than in the United States and a large well-kept tract of "featureless" lawn was popular with many middle-class Canadians.

In the post-war era, suburban Canada gained its own distinctive architectural styles and this extended to front yards and gardens. Rather than the stark white façades of stately American houses, wealthy Canadians of the 60s and 70s showed a preference for wood, in particular "diagonal cedar panelling". To match that trend, front yards of such houses were often paved to match the entrances of modern city buildings; "no elite home of the 1970s was complete without a front yard of interlocking brick".

As in other cultures, Canadian front yards became areas of socialisation between the public street and the private home; a space for street parties, family barbecues and neighbourly conversation.

=== Europe ===
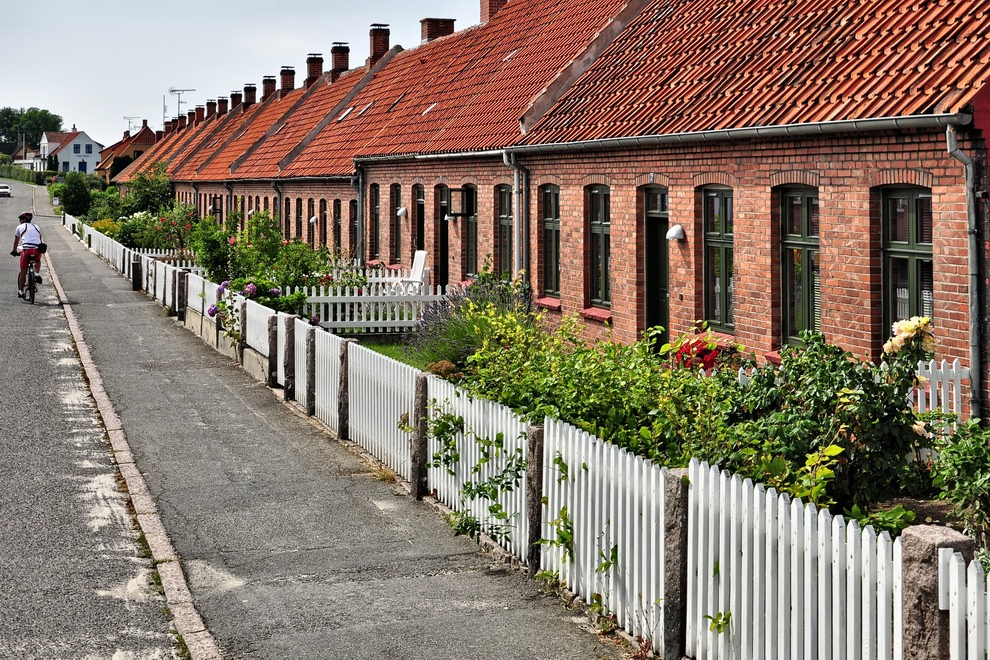
A row of front gardens on the Danish island of Bornholm.

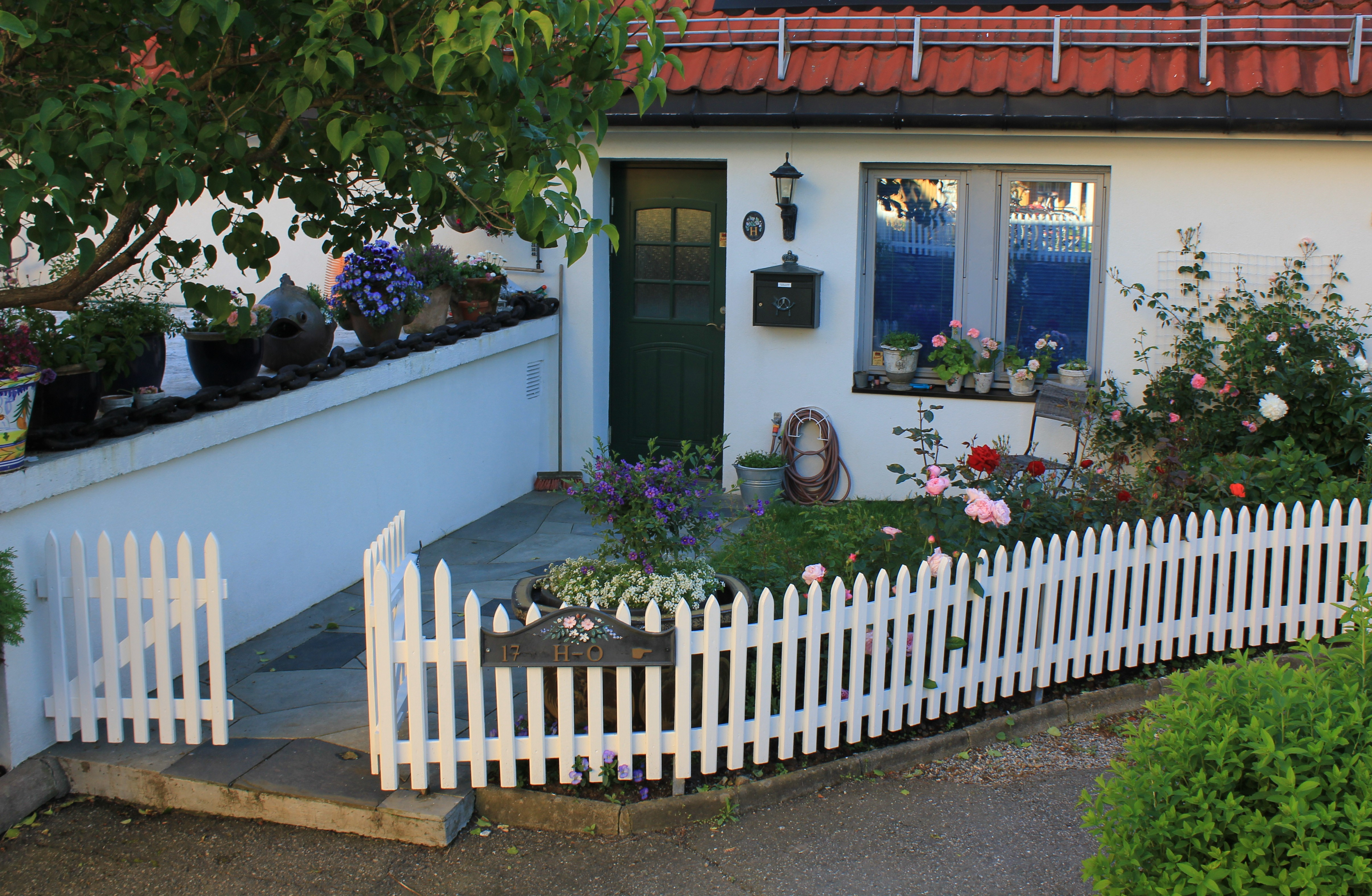
Small front garden in Denmark

The earliest form of front garden was the open courtyard popular with Spanish and Italian nobility. As housing evolved, so too did gardens and façades. Enclosed courtyards were surpassed in popularity by the large manicured gardens of French, German and Dutch palaces and stately homes. These traditions were carried by the Europeans to the Americas where courtyards remained popular among Spanish settlers in Florida while productive cottage gardens became commonplace among Dutch settlers and English pilgrims in Massachusetts.

As suburbs developed around major European cities, the attitude to privacy, and by extension to front gardens, was decidedly different from that of the British. As one Dutch commentator highlighted (in the 1950s):

The Dutch language has no word that expresses the English concept of 'privacy': the right to be alone. It is not without reason that the English language has such a word and ours has not. It is a difference rooted in national character, and it can also be recognised in other places. We have low fences around almost every garden and yard, for example, but the English like high walls and hedges around their gardens, lest passers-by can look inside.

In older cities and townships (with houses built several centuries earlier) front gardens are far less common, with front doors providing residents with access direct to the street. In these cases, planter boxes and micro-gardens have become popular as a way of "greening" façades that would otherwise be without plants; elements that make a, "significant contribution to the quality of the environment".

==== United Kingdom ====
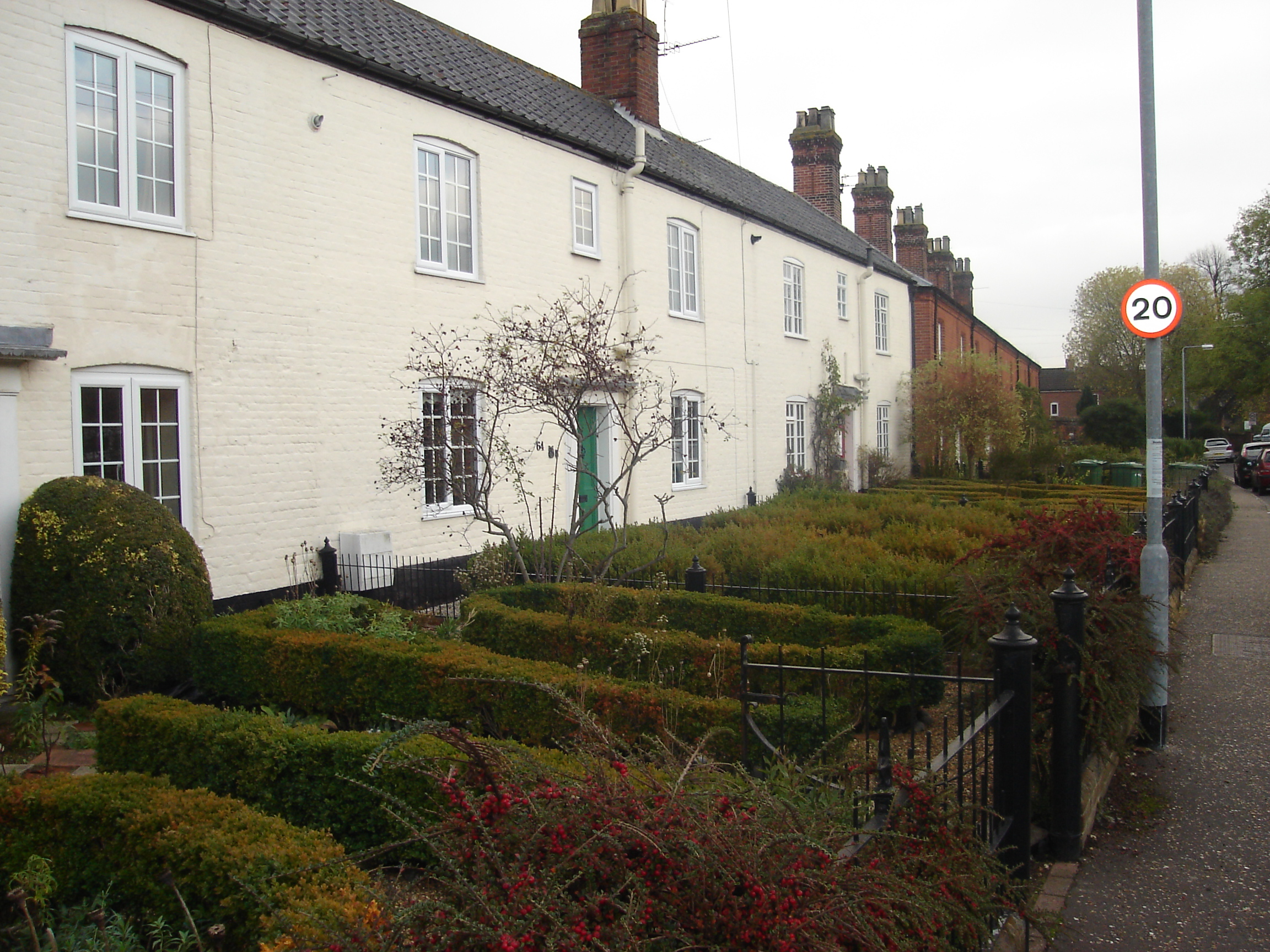
The densely planted front gardens of terrace cottages in Norfolk, England.

In British English, the space in question is referred to as a front garden.

Urban housing in the United Kingdom originally had no separation between the house front and the street. The introduction of the byelaw terraced house, a type of dwelling built to comply with the Public Health Act 1875, raised the standards of accommodation. The provision of a front garden in new houses became common practice during the second half of the 19th century as part of the Domestic Revival style within Victorian architecture: "to provide for the majority of new, even fairly modest, houses, a small front garden or paved forecourt, and a garden or yard at the back". Front gardens were "commonplace" for new residences by the 1870s. The front garden was "largely ornamental" and initially more important than the back, which was sometimes eliminated to allow more space for service areas. A fairly standard layout was adopted with a stone or brick wall to emulate the "grandeur of approach and walled privacy of large houses" and a straight path from the gate to the front door. Often, the cottage garden style of thick planting of mixed types of flowers was adopted. This supposedly originated in the gardens of rural cottages, where front gardens had long been common. In the houses of the working class, the small rear garden was often more functional, as a space for drying clothes, having children play and the like, and any efforts at ornamental gardening took place in the front garden.

Early in the 20th century, housing developments influenced by the garden city movement, initiated by Ebenezer Howard in 1898, featured detached houses with undivided "communal grass areas" in front of them. In essence, the houses shared a front garden.

However, outside these developments the dominant form of new housing in the United Kingdom until after World War II, especially in London, was the semi-detached, which superseded the previous dominant terraced house and where a garden was part of the ideal. The front garden, smaller than the back, was separated from the street by a lower wall than in the Victorian house; some developers planted hedges and provided instructions on their care. Gardening was a widely shared hobby and source of pride; developers sometimes prepared the front garden (almost never the back) as an inducement to buy, and sometimes held contests for the best front garden. However, since the houses were not always provided with garages, as motor vehicles became more common, the front garden was increasingly often used as a car parking area or enclosed by a garage.

During the Great Depression, local authorities encouraged families to grow produce in their own front gardens, thereby increasing community food supplies. Gardening was introduced in some schools, and towns introduced competitions and awards for attractive and productive front gardens. (See Dig for victory.)

In the post-war era of the 1950s and 60s, many of those front garden areas used for parking were paved over and became mini-driveways. This trend also became more common as professional gardeners became less common, thus increasing the need for home owners to maintain what was often a very small section of lawn or planted garden.

=== United States ===
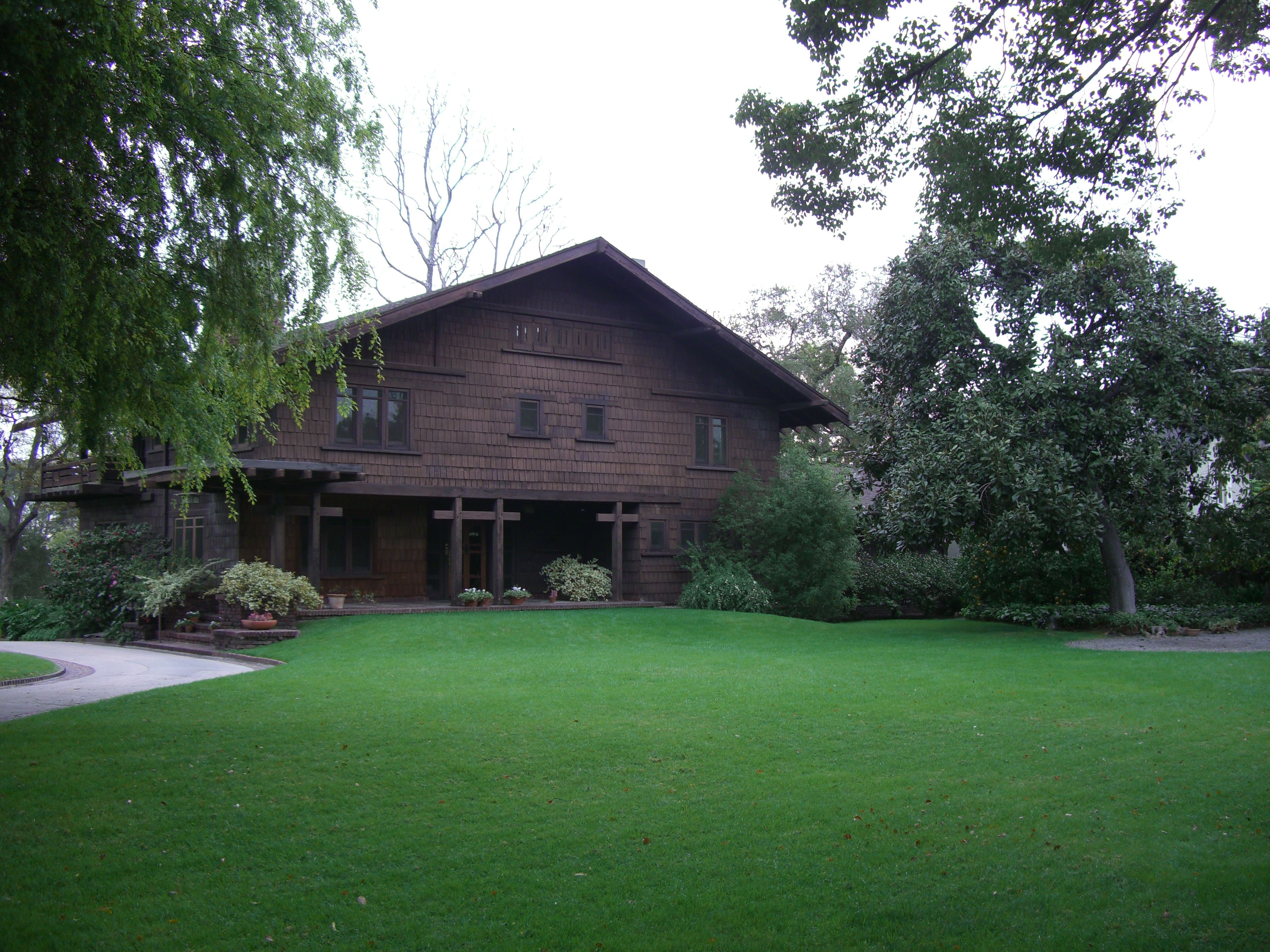
The front yard of the 1909-built, Greene and Greene-designed Spinks house, California.

As residential areas were subdivided and developed during the late 19th and early 20th centuries, the "suburban ideal" demanded large front yards, "dominated" by the facades of the houses they bounded.

The size of new front yards gradually decreased during the second half of the 20th century as houses were built closer and closer to the front of housing blocks.

In the 1870s, lawn ornaments became a popular front yard feature, with wrought iron sculpture, bird baths and gazebos being particularly popular. Throughout the 1880s and 90s, wicker lawn furniture became popular before being replaced in the early 1900s by nursery rhyme character and animal ornaments. In the post-war period, kitsch ornaments including plastic flamingoes and garden gnomes became popular.

During the 1930s a new American Style took hold, inspired by the architectural designs of Frank Lloyd Wright, Bernard Maybeck and Greene and Greene; "informality, naturalness, interlocking indoor-outdoor design, greatly reduced flower-beds, privacy for outdoor recreation and leisure...".

Local ordinances determine what owners and residents can and cannot do in their front yards. In recent times, sustainability enthusiasts and practitioners have attempted to use their front yards to grow organic produce, in violation of existing codes. In Orlando, Florida, for example, city codes set standards for front yard ground covering and prescribe lawns only. Residents there have received citations for breaching the code by growing vegetable gardens and are currently fighting to have the ordinances amended. The illegality of growing vegetables in the front yard first received public attention due to the Oak Park incident in 2011. The "Urban Farming Guidebook — Planning for the Business of Growing Food in BC's Towns & Cities" provides an explanation to this recurring phenomenon "The Garden City model embraced food production and its systems as key elements of community design. However, the race to the single use zoned suburbs did not include food production as part of the design of suburbs....urban farming was excluded from our lists of permitted uses and such farming became non-conforming or simply illegal uses which, if they were lucky, avoided bylaw attention".

Since the early 2000s, once-common front yard "accoutrements" (like basketball rings on garages) are becoming less common; many are now prohibited by local government ordinances.

== See also ==
- Backyard
- Back garden
- Front Yards in Bloom
- Setback (land use)
- List of garden types
- Garden centre
