= List of garden features =

Garden features are physical elements, both natural and manmade, used in garden design.

- Artificial waterfall
- Avenue
- Aviary
- Bog garden
- Borrowed scenery
- Bosquet
- Belvedere
- Chashitsu (tea house)
- Chōzubachi (basin)
- Deck
- Dirty kitchen
- Exedra
- Fence
- Fish pond
- Folly
- Footbridge
- Fountain
- Garden buildings
- Garden pond
- Garden railway
- Garden room
- Gazebo
- Gloriette
- Greenhouse
- Green wall
- Grotto
  - Shell grotto
- Ha-ha
- Hedge
- Hedge maze
- Herbaceous border
- Herb garden
- Jeux d'eau
- Kitchen garden
- Knot garden
- Koi pond
- Landscape lighting
- Lawn
  - Tapestry lawn
  - Moss lawn
- Monopteros
- Moon bridge
- Moon gate
- Mound
- Nine-turn bridge
- Nymphaeum
- Orangery
- Pagoda
- Parterre
- Patio
- Pavilion
- Pergola
- Picnic table
- Reflecting pool
- Rockery
- Scandinavian grillhouse
- Scholar's rock
- Shade house
- Shed
- Stepping stones
- Stone wall
- Stumpery
- Sylvan theater
- Summerhouse
- Terrace
- Topiary
- Tōrō (lantern)
- Trellis
- Turf maze
- Water feature
- Water garden
- Woodland garden
- Zig-zag bridge

== Gallery ==
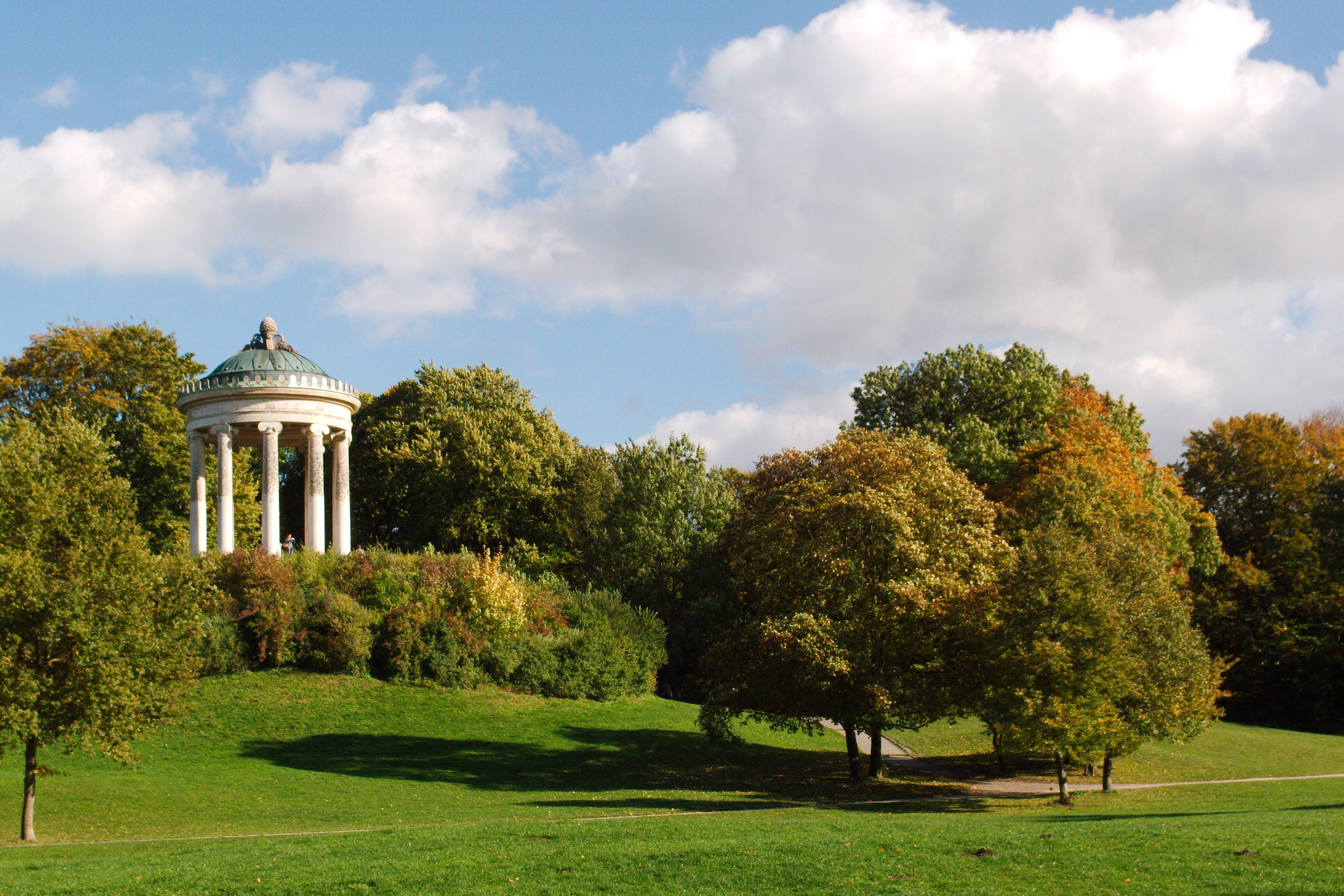
Monopteros in the Munich Englischer Garten

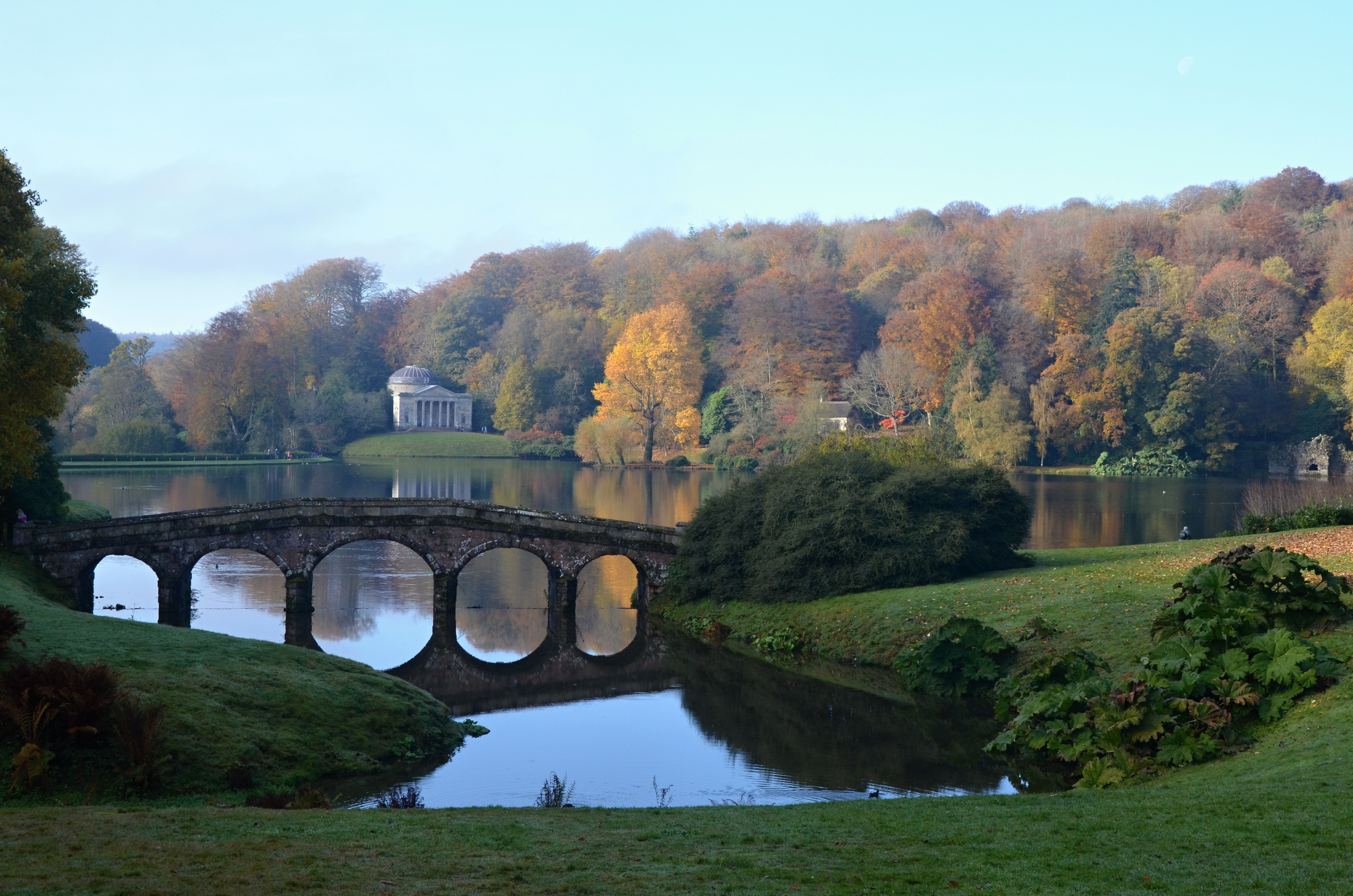
Palladian bridge and Pantheon at Stourhead garden

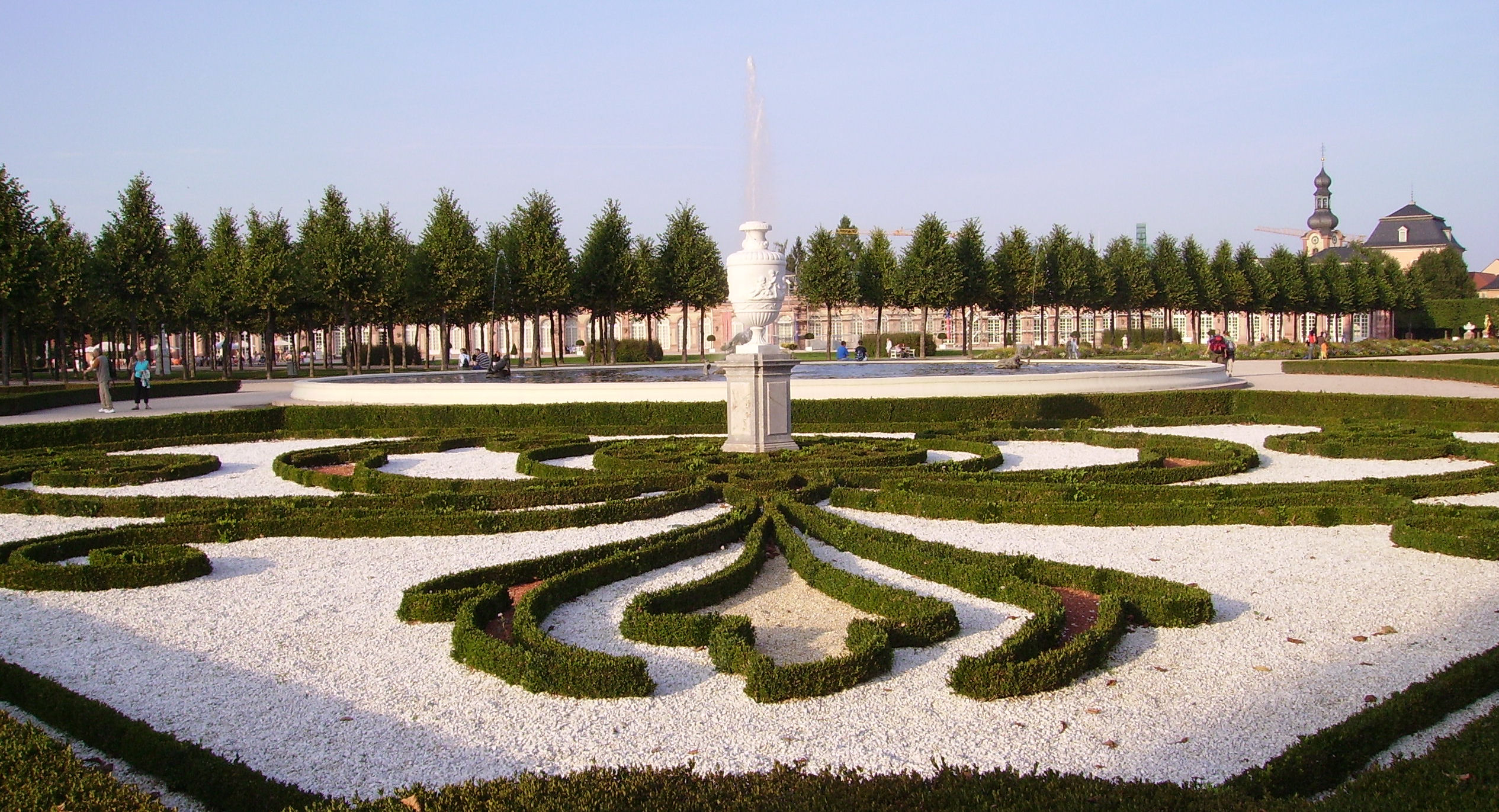
Broderie in the Schwetzingen Palace garden

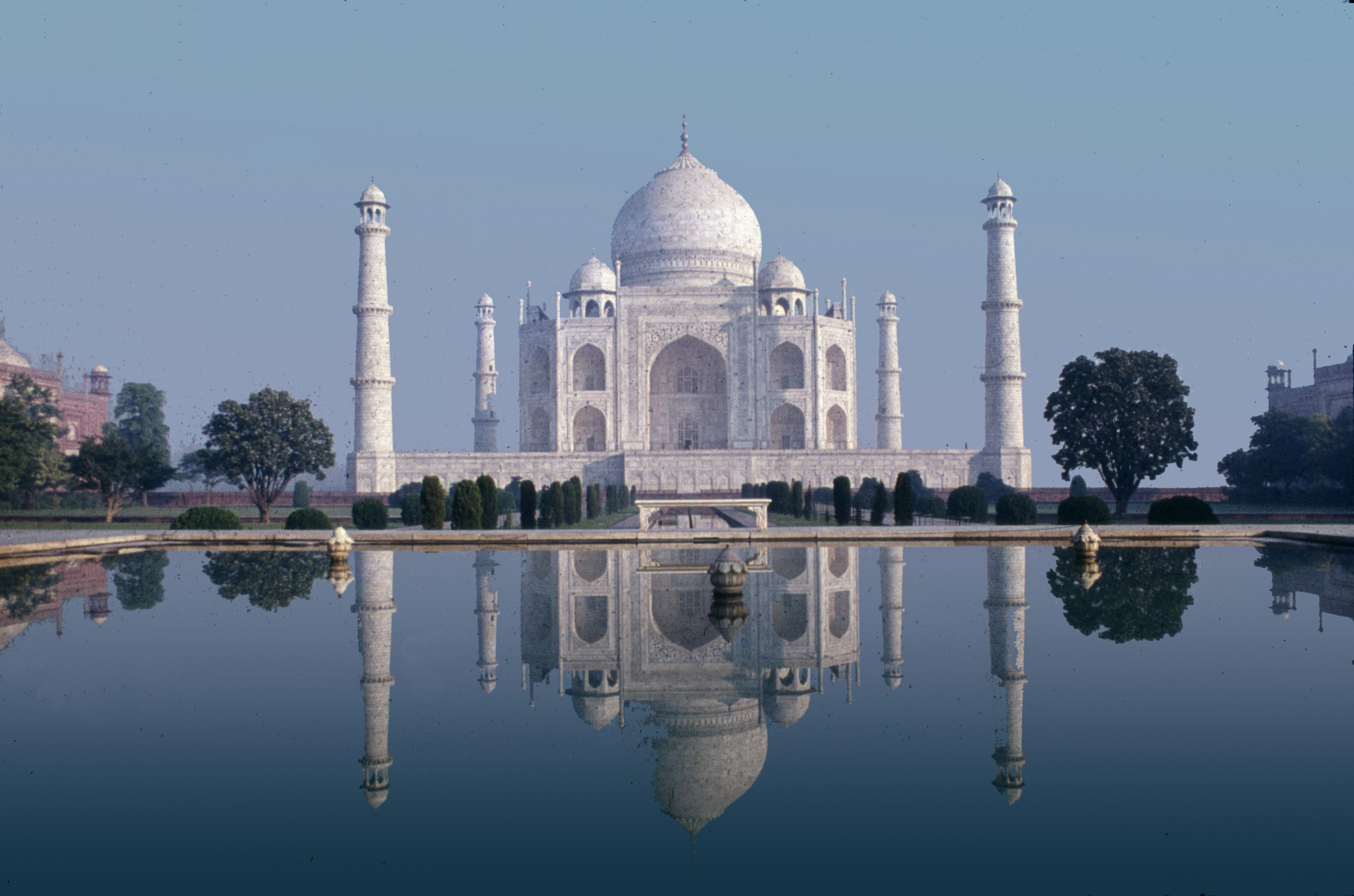
Reflecting pool mirroring the Taj Mahal at Agra, India

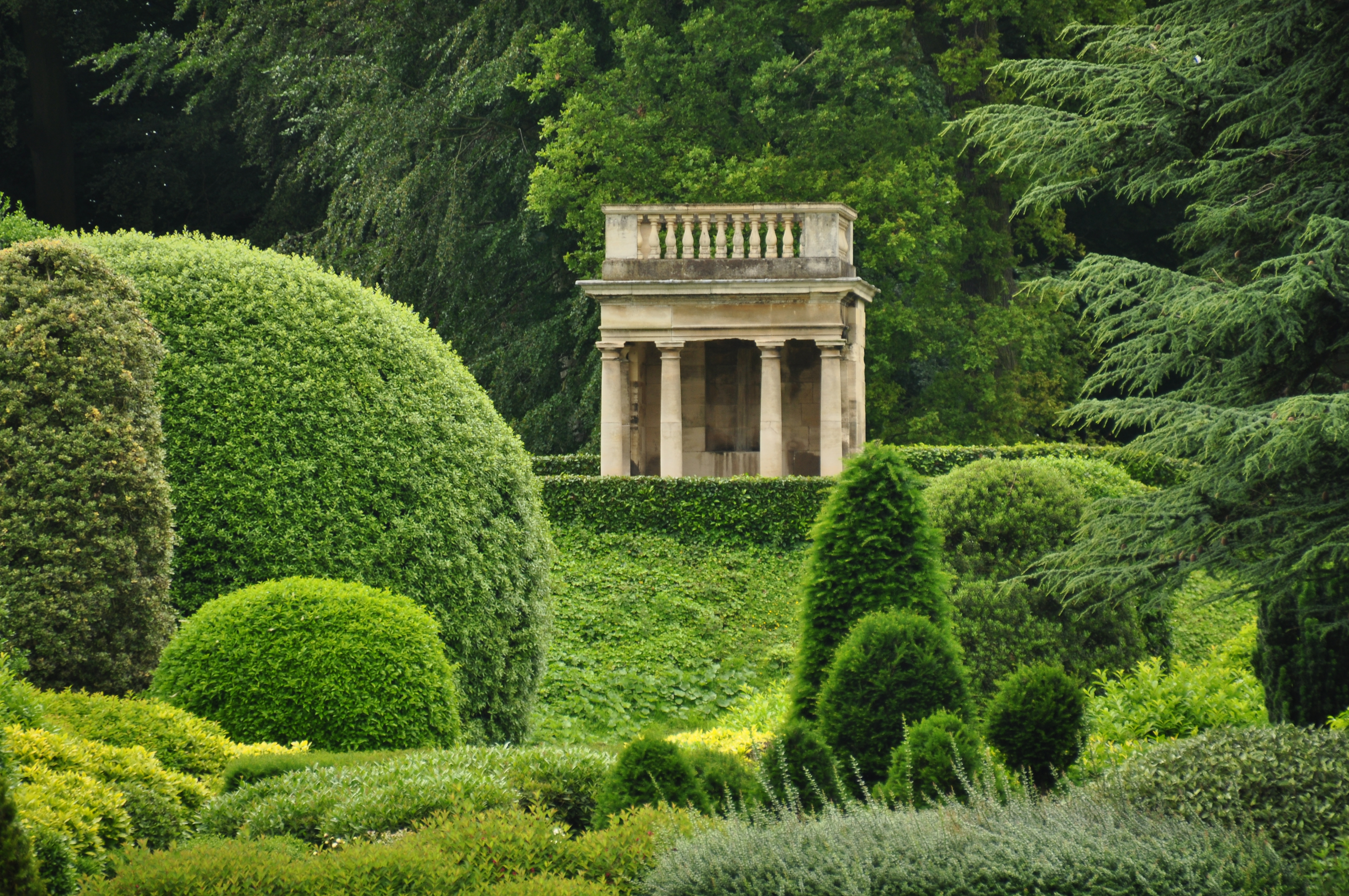
Folly in Brodsworth Hall garden

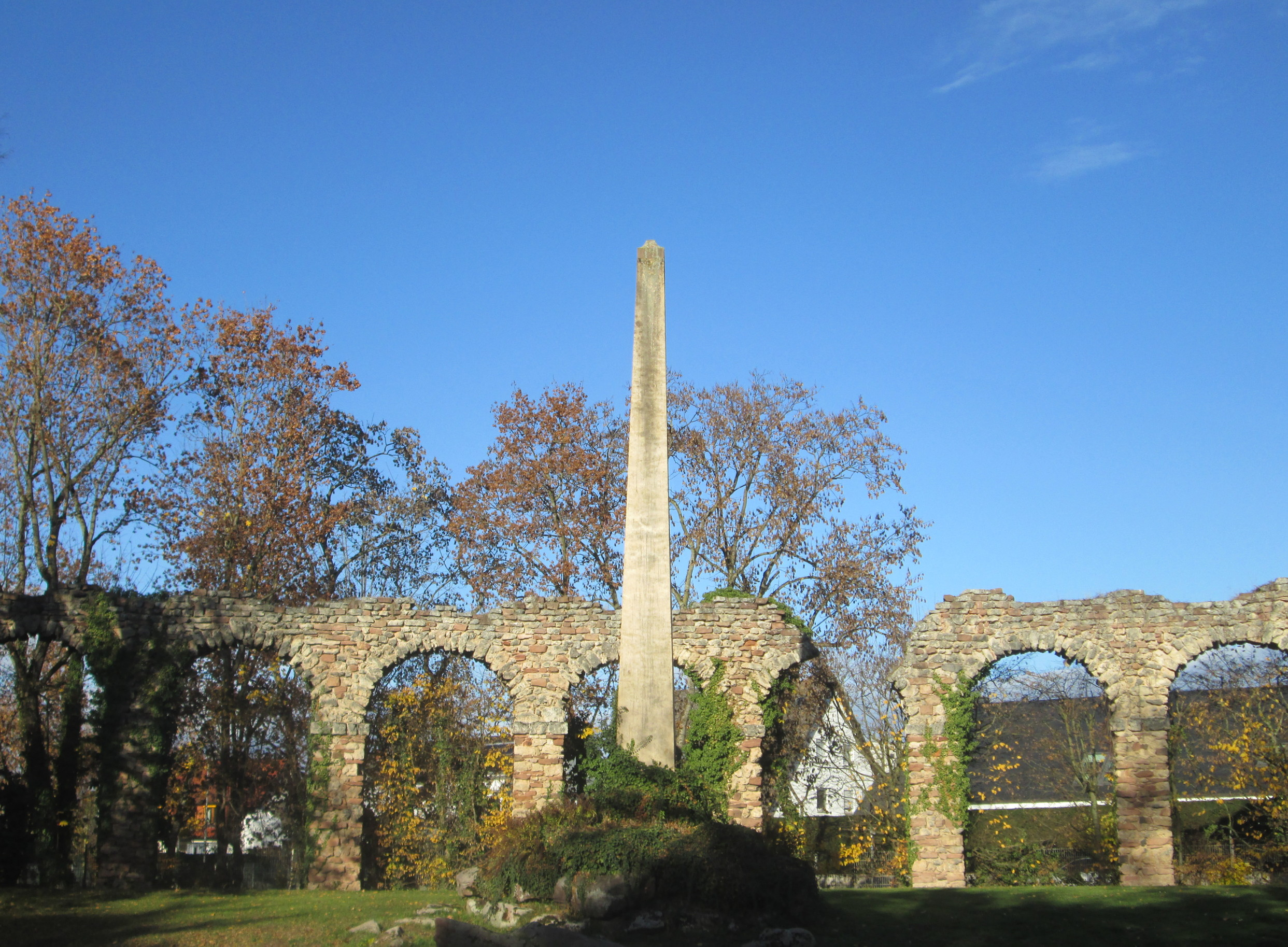
Obelisk and Roman aqueduct at Schwetzingen Palace garden

== See also ==
- Eyecatchers
- Garden ornament
- Lawn ornament
- Category:Types of garden
- Category:Garden ornaments
