= Garden buildings =

Structure built in a garden or backyard

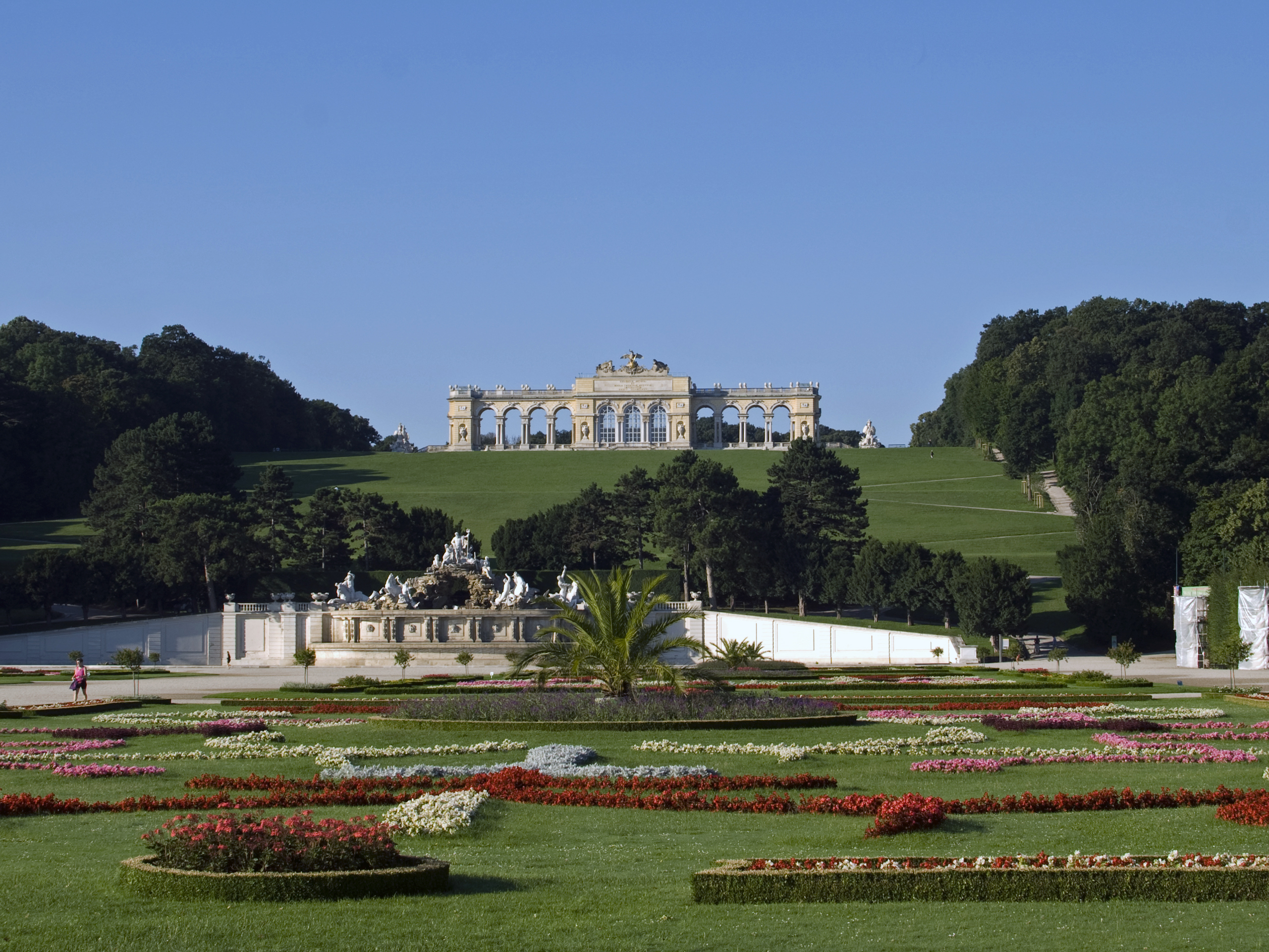
Gloriette in the gardens of the Schönbrunn Palace, Vienna, Austria

A garden building is a structure built in a garden, frontyard or backyard.

Such structures include:

- Alcove, a small recessed opening in a wall
- Arbor, a type of pergola
- Arcade, a series of adjoining arches
- Arch, curved vertical structure with an open space underneath it
- Archway, a passage under an arch or series of arches
- Bengal cottage, Danish hut, et cetera
- Berceau, Italianised as bersò, a shaded resting place with no walls and roof made up of only a framework, variant of pergola
- Bower, a dwelling or lean-to shelter, also known as a variation of a pergola
- Casina, an architectural form often resembling small classical temples and follies
- Casita, structure detached from a house with a main room with a kitchenette and a bathroom
- Colonnade, a long sequence of columns joined by their entablature, either free-standing or part of a building
- Cloister, a covered walkway around a garden with an open gallery, providing shelter from sun and rain
- Cabana, a type of shelter often found near beaches or pools, for instance used for relaxing in the shade or changing clothes
- Folly, a building constructed primarily for decoration or aesthetic pleasure
- Garden office, a structure separated from a house, in similar in size and construction to a garden shed, but used as an office space (see also Cabinet)
- Gazebo, a type of pavilion, sometimes octagonal or turret-shaped, often built in a park, garden, or spacious public area
- Gloriette, garden building placed on a site that is elevated with respect to the surroundings, varying in greatly in execution, for example in the form of a pavilion
- Greenhouse, structure designed to regulate the temperature and humidity of the environment inside
- Grillkota, Sámi or Scandinavian grillhouses with seating centred around an open wood or charcoal-fired grill
- Kiosk, traditionally a small garden pavilion open on some or all sides
- Loggia, a small garden structure or house built on the roof of a residence, open on one or more sides, to enjoy cooling winds and the view
- Nymphaeum, monuments in ancient Greece and Rome consecrated to the mythologic nymphs, especially those of springs, and sometimes arranged as to furnish a supply of water
- Orangery, a type of greenhouse or conservatory for fruit trees
- Pavilion, small and often symmetrical building used for relaxation, and can either be separated or attached to a main building
- Pergola, outdoor garden feature forming a shaded walkway or sitting area
- Ramada, a shelter equipped with a roof but no walls, or only partially enclosed.
- Rotunda, a roofed building with a circular ground plan, sometimes covered by a dome
- Shadow house, for example a gazebo or pavilion
- Shed, modest outbuilding used for shelter or storage
- Sylvan theater, an outdoor theater situated in a wooded garden setting, with seating on the grass, often adorned with classical motifs like columns or statues and greenery

== See also ==
- Summer house, building or shelter used for relaxation in warm weather
