= Lowell Cemetery =

Lowell Cemetery may refer to:

- Lowell Cemetery (Lowell, Massachusetts)
- Evergreen Cemetery (Bisbee, Arizona), also known as "Lowell Cemetery"
- Lowell Cemetery (Lowell, Wisconsin)
