= Don Featherstone (artist) =

American artist (1936–2015)

- Born: Donald Featherstone; January 25, 1936; Worcester, Massachusetts, U.S.
- Died: June 22, 2015 (aged 79); Fitchburg, Massachusetts, U.S.
- Known for: Sculpture
- Notable work: Plastic flamingo
- Awards: Ig Nobel – Art Prize; 1996 Plastic flamingo

Donald Featherstone (January 25, 1936 – June 22, 2015) was an American artist most widely known for his 1957 creation of the plastic pink flamingo while working for Union Products. Featherstone resided in Fitchburg, Massachusetts, where he kept 57 plastic flamingos on his back lawn. Featherstone and his wife Nancy dressed alike for over 35 years.

== Biography ==
Featherstone was born in Worcester, Massachusetts, in 1936 and spent part of his childhood in Berlin where his grandparents owned a wool mill. He attended Hudson High School in Massachusetts.

After graduating from the Worcester Art Museum's art school, in 1957, he was offered a job designing three-dimensional animals for Union Products, Inc. Over his years at Union Products, Featherstone sculpted over 750 different items, the first two of which were a girl with a water can and a boy with a dog. When Featherstone was asked in 1957 to sculpt a duck, he purchased one, which he named Charlie, and later released the bird in Coggshall Park. Later that year, he was asked to carve a flamingo. The future iconic pink flamingo went on sale in 1958, when the color pink was popular.

In 1996, Featherstone was awarded the 1996 Ig Nobel Art Prize for his creation of the pink flamingo, and he also began his tenure as president of Union Products, which he held until he retired in 2000.

On June 22, 2015, Featherstone died from Lewy body dementia at the age of 79. Visitors often leave pink flamingos of their own on the lawn around his grave.

== Pink flamingo ==
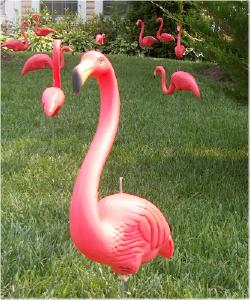
A plastic flamingo as designed by Don Featherstone

Featherstone based his creation on photographs of flamingos from National Geographic, as he was not able to obtain real flamingos to use as models. As time went on, the plastic flamingo became more popular. They appeared across the country and even as parts of various art exhibits. In 1987, Donald Featherstone inscribed his signature in the original plastic mold. This was apparently to help distinguish between original and "knock-off" pink plastic flamingos. Featherstone's signature was briefly removed from the bird in 2001, but was quickly replaced due to a small boycott of the unsigned birds.

In November 2006, Union Products closed and production of the flamingo stopped. Shortly thereafter, a New York company purchased the molds for Featherstone's flamingos and subcontracted production to a Fitchburg company, Cado Products. In 2010, Cado Products purchased the copyrights and plastic molds for the pink flamingos and continues to manufacture them. They are generally sold in sets of two—one holding its head erect, nearly three feet (0.91 m) high, the other bending over as if looking for food.

Featherstone kept dozens of plastic flamingos in his backyard, and frequently attended flamingo-related events. He said, "People say they’re tacky, but all great art began as tacky," pointing out that Art Deco architecture in New York City was once torn down.

== Personal life ==
Featherstone has two children. After his first marriage ended in divorce, he met Nancy Santino at a trade show in 1975. They began a long distance relationship, with Featherstone visiting her in St. Louis every other weekend before marrying in 1976.

=== Matching outfits ===
In the late 1970s, Nancy began sewing all of their clothing, and the couple began wearing matching outfits. By December 1980, they wore matching outfits every day. When asked why, Nancy said "Our clothing makes us happy. We do it because we like it."

She said, "Initially we matched only at weekends, but as I grew adept at making more complex garments, such as jackets, sweaters, and coats, we decided to go full time with our identical look." The couple kept four wardrobes full of twin outfits, hanging two by two."

In 1997, Nancy was quoted in The New York Times Magazine as saying, "A priest once told me that heaven is what you want it to be. For me it's always being with Donald — whether we're dressed alike or not." Upon his death in 2015, she said, "Donald was a unique, one-of-a-kind individual. There was no one like Donald. Absolutely no one."

== See also ==
- List of Ig Nobel Prize winners
