= Communities in Bloom =

Canadian non-profit organization

Communities in Bloom is a Canadian non-profit organization that fosters friendly competition between Canadian communities to beautify their civic spaces. It was established in 1995 as a national competition between 29 communities, and has since expanded to include competitions in various categories, both nationally and provincially. The competition is also called Communities in Bloom.

In order to participate in the competition, a community must register with Communities in Bloom, and submit a payment dependent on the community's population. The payment also depends on whether the community participates in the provincial or national competition.

The competition is divided into six criteria:

- Tidiness,
- Environmental Awareness,
- Heritage Conservation,
- Urban Forestry,
- Landscaped Areas, and
- Floral Displays.

Each community is judged on their capacity to improve the community in these categories. Communities are awarded a Bloom Rating based on its achievements from one to five. Each community is also recognized for achievement in a particular area or through a specific initiative.

Category awards are also given for communities that show great strength in one category in particular.

== National Awards ==
The Communities in Bloom national awards have been hosted by various municipalities across Canada.

| Year | City |
|---|---|
| 1995 | Ottawa, ON |
| 1996 | Hull, QC |
| 1997 | Winnipeg, MB |
| 1999 | Halifax, NS |
| 2000 | Edmonton, AB |
| 2001 | Saint John, NB |
| 2002 | Kelowna, BC |
| 2003 | Stratford, ON |
| 2004 | Charlottetown, PE |
| 2005 | Saskatoon, SK |
| 2006 | Brandon, MB |
| 2007 | Greater Moncton Region, NB |
| 2008 | Lethbridge, AB |
| 2009 | Vaughan, ON |
| 2010 | Halifax Regional Municipality, NS |
| 2011 | National Battlefields Commission (Quebec City), QC |
| 2012 | Edmonton & Capital Region, AB |
| 2013 | National Capital Commission (Ottawa, ON) |
| 2014 | Charlottetown, PEI |
| 2015 | Kamloops, BC |

== See also ==
- America in Bloom
- Front Yards in Bloom
