= Garden ornament =

Decorative object placed on a lawn

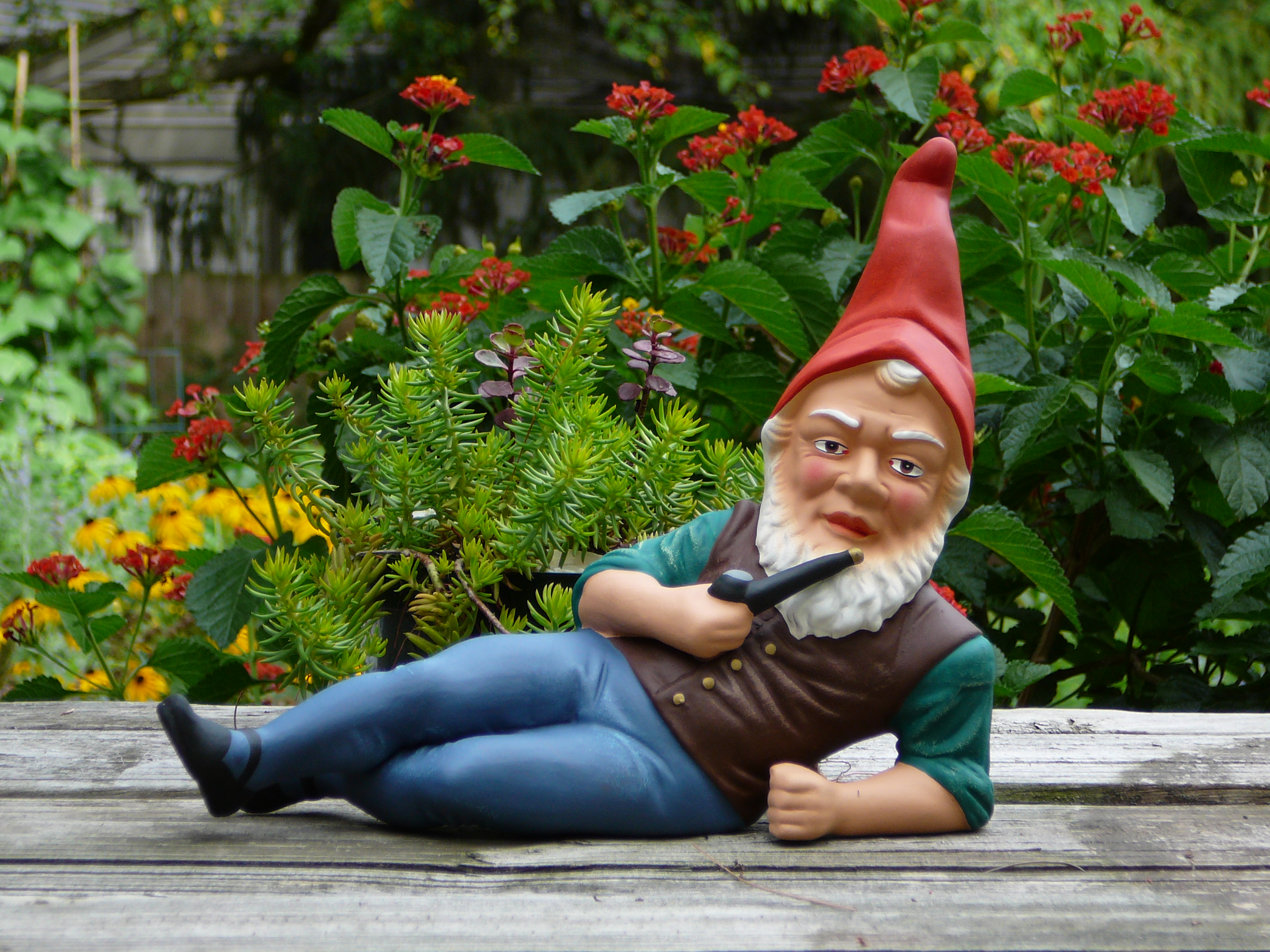
German garden gnome in a Wendelin landscape

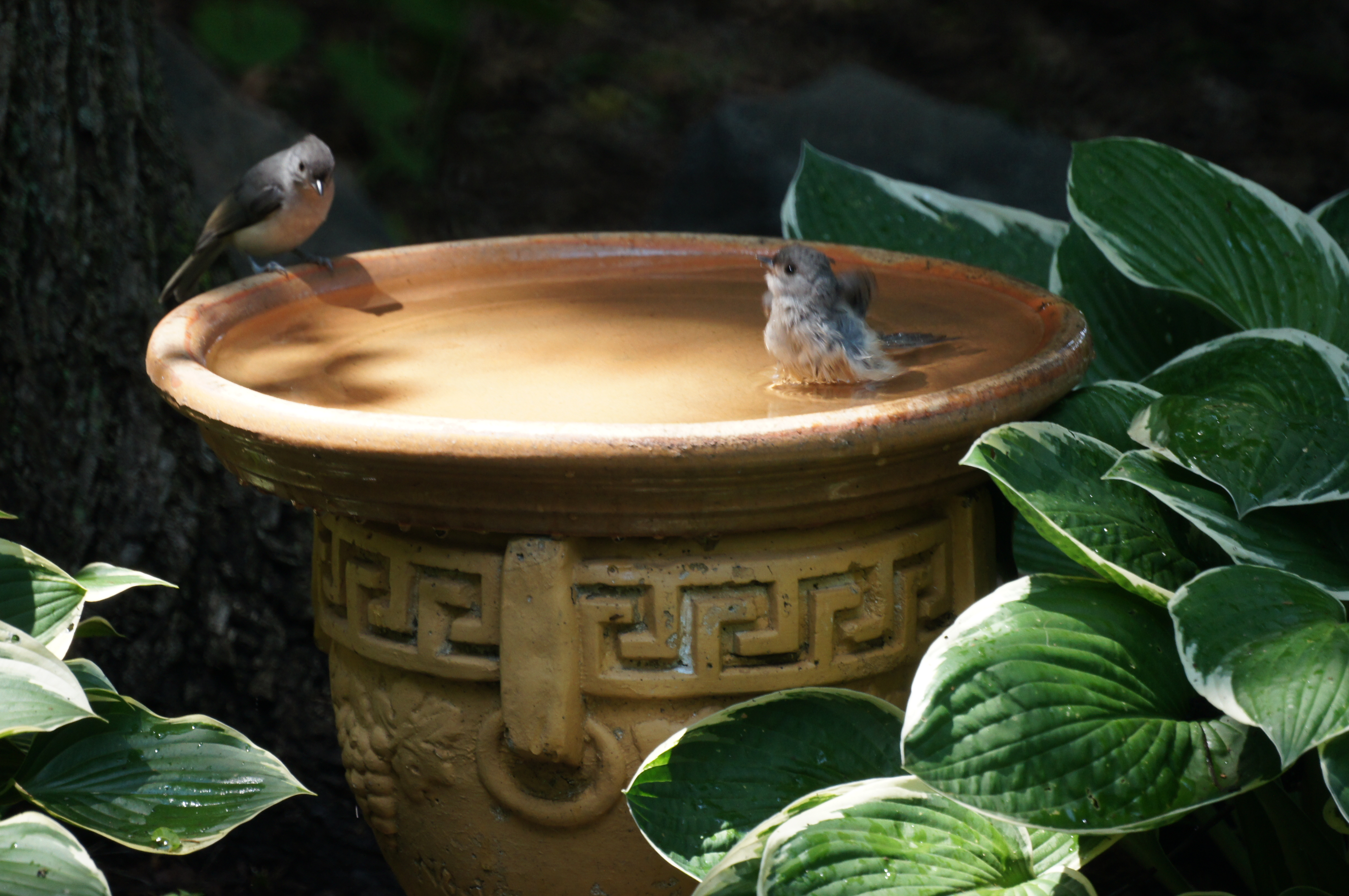
Bird bath

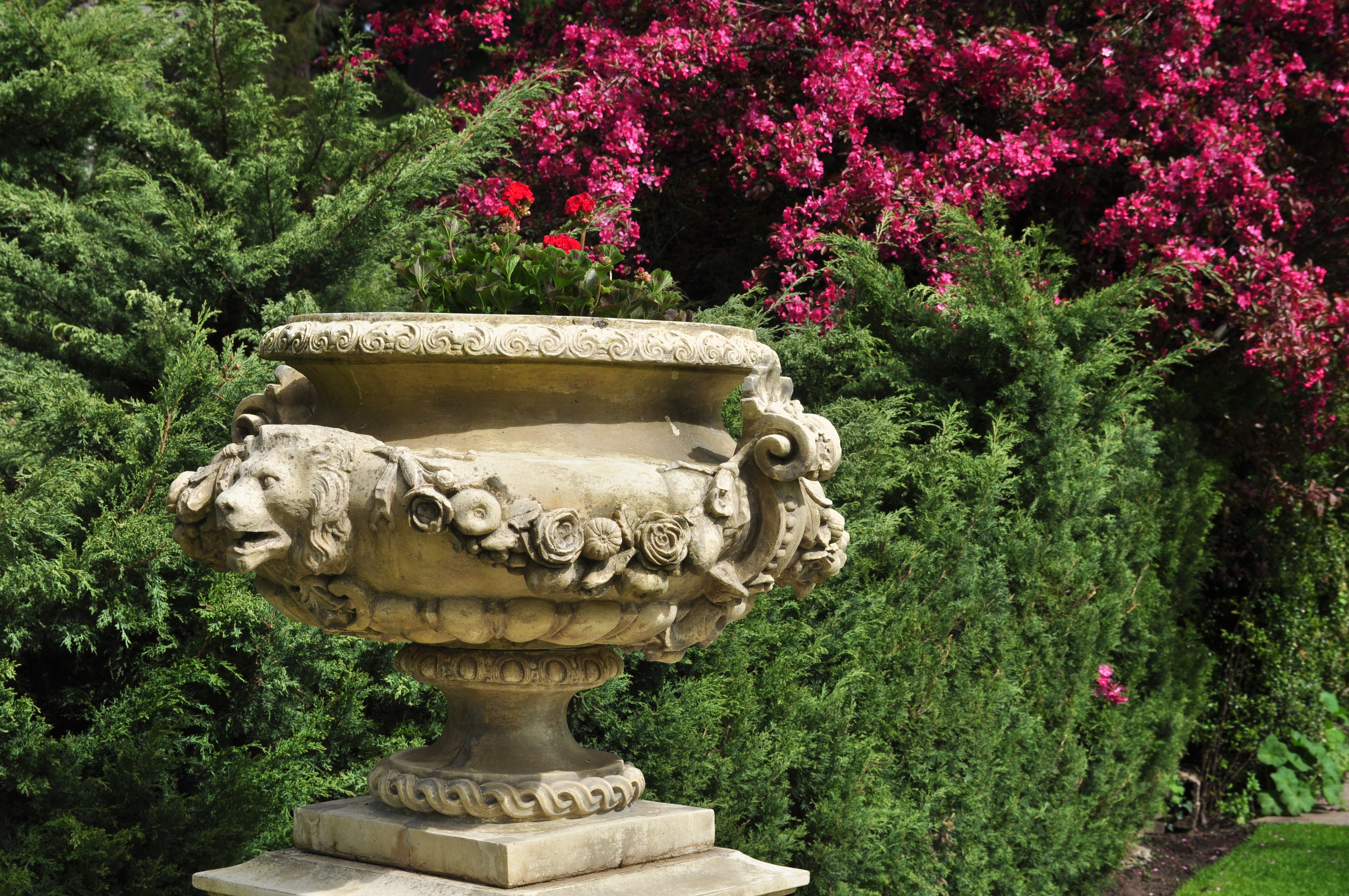
Pedestal urn planter at Thornewood Castle, Lakewood, Washington

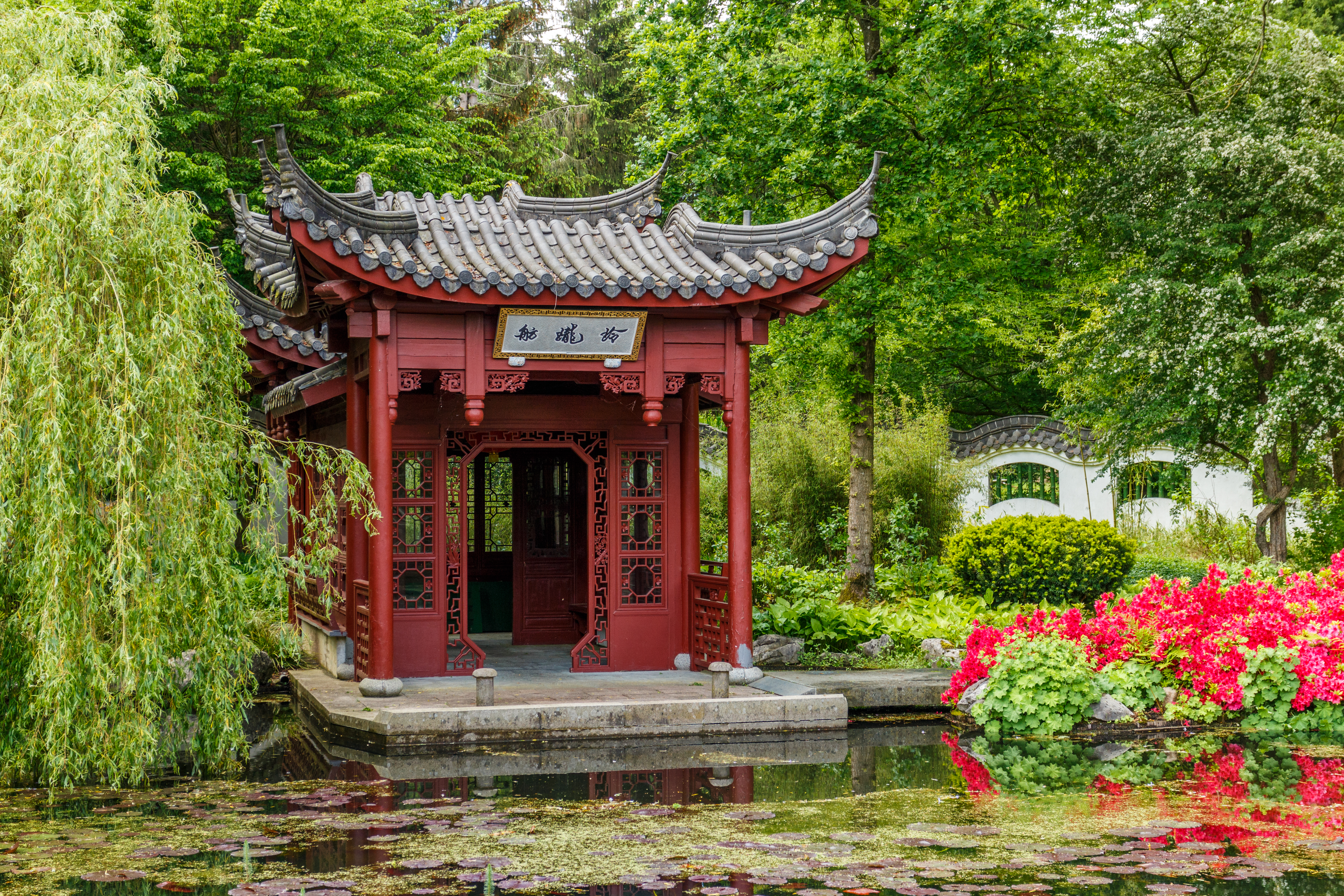
Pavilion in the Hortus Haren, Haren, Groningen, Netherlands

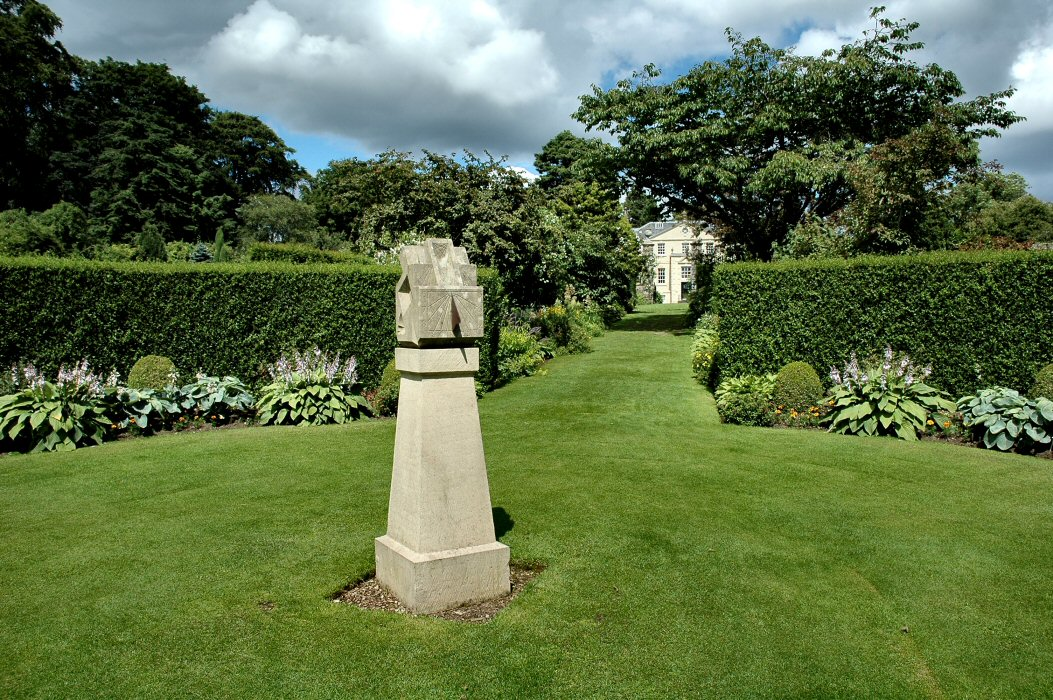
Sundial as a centrepiece at Greenbank Garden in Carolside, Scotland

A garden ornament or lawn ornament is a non-plant item used for garden, landscape, and park enhancement and decoration.

== History ==
Early examples of the use of garden ornaments in western culture were seen in Ancient Roman gardens such as those excavated at Pompeii and Herculaneum. The Italian Renaissance garden and French formal garden styles were the peak of using created forms in the garden and landscape, with high art and kitsch interpretations ever since. The English landscape garden expanded the scale of some garden ornaments to temple follies

The Asian tradition of making garden ornaments, often functioning in association with Feng Shui principles, has a nearly timeless history. Chinese gardens with Chinese scholar's rocks, Korean stone art, and Japanese gardens with Suiseki and Zen rock gardens have a symbolic meaning and natural ornamental qualities.

== Types ==
Garden ornaments include:

- bench
- bird baths
- bird feeders
- birdhouses
- columns – cast stone
- fire basket
- flower box
  - jardiniere
  - window box
- fountains
  - kugel fountain
- garden furniture
- gazing spheres
- hanging baskets
- landscape lighting – decorative fixtures
- outdoor candle
- outdoor fireplace
- Scholar's rock, a traditional Chinese feature
- outdoor sculpture
  - sculpture trail
  - found objects such as recycled bowling balls, toilet planters, antique farm equipment
  - kinetic sculpture
  - masks
  - obelisks
  - renewable energy sculpture
- pagoda – small versions
- pedestals – e.g. terracotta, cast stone
- pots
  - urns
  - ceramic art vases
- rain chains
- sundials
- waterfalls – small prefabricated type
- weathervanes
- wind chimes

=== Lawn ornament ===
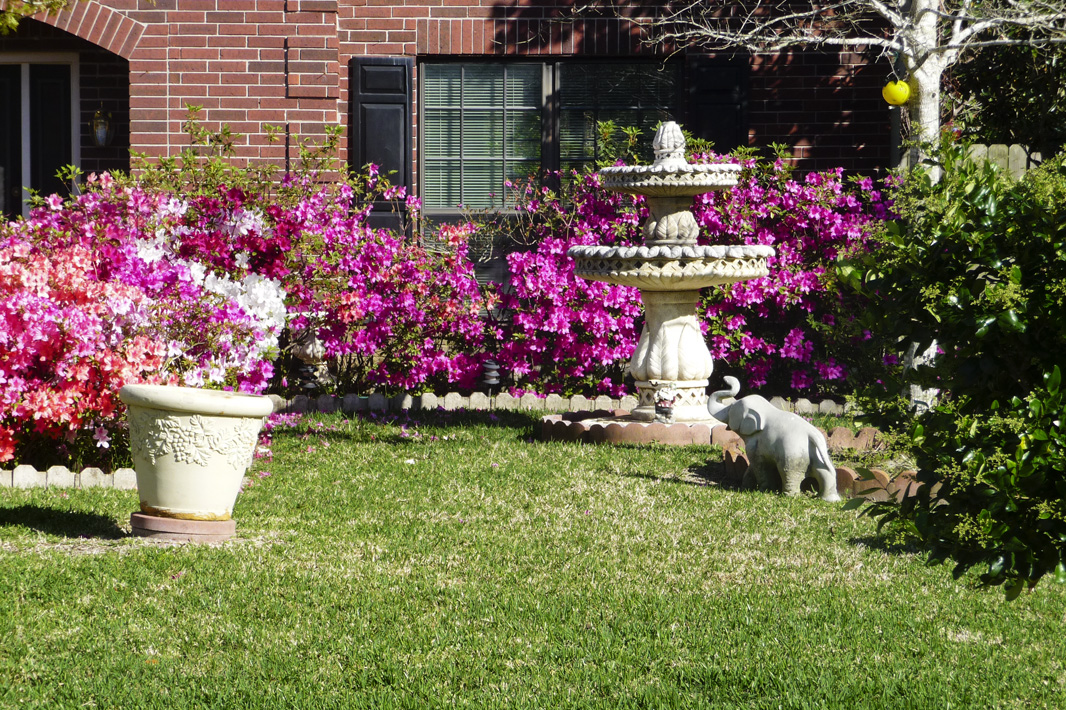
A front lawn featuring a fountain and a small sculpture of an elephant

Lawn ornaments are decorative objects placed in the grassy area of a property.

- Animal forms: animal statues such as frogs, turtles, rabbits, deer, flamingoes and ducks are cast in plastic or cement.
- Bathtub Madonna: a statue of Mary the mother of Jesus is placed in a bathtub half buried under the ground. Statues of Mary are most often made of white concrete, but are sometimes painted with a blue garment.
- Bird bath: a structure designed to hold water for birds to bathe in or drink, generally supported upon a pedestal, is known as a bird bath.
- Bird feeder: a container for foods such as bird seeds is often designed to look like a miniature house or barn, and may be mounted on a stake, post, or column.
- Concrete Aboriginal: a lawn ornament once common in Australia.
- Concrete goose: a popular lawn ornament in the United States.

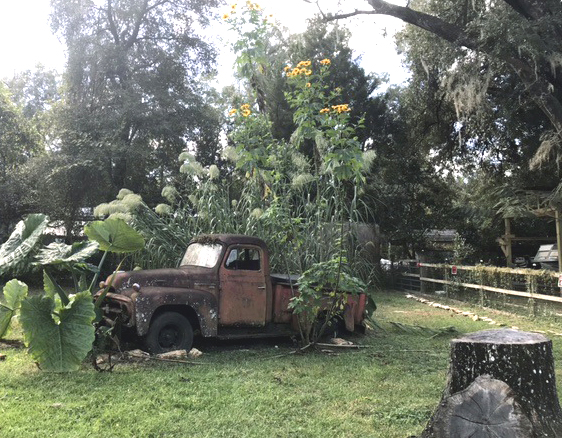
A front lawn featuring an International Truck is an example of "found object art". Elephant ears and sunflowers were purposely planted to adorn the antique farm equipment on this US lawn.

- Found object art: items such as bowling balls, toilet planters, and antique farm equipment may be repurposed as lawn ornaments.
- Francis of Assisi: a saint often associated with nature and animals may be cast in plaster or cement.
- Garden gnome: a small, generally colorful gnome statuette.
- Human form: a depiction of a human being. Human form lawn ornaments can be two-dimensional, generally vertically supported by being thrust in the ground, or three-dimensional. Examples of human form lawn ornaments include the concrete Aboriginal, lawn jockey and groomsman. Examples of two-dimensional human form lawn ornaments include renditions of Amish and Pennsylvania Dutch people. A variation of the Pennsylvania Dutch human form is a depiction of an older female bending over as in gardening, thus revealing her undergarments.
- Jigglers: plastic or metal flowers, birds and insects fitted on spring-loaded stakes so that they jiggle when the wind blows on them.
- Lawn jockey, or Jocko, or Groomsmen: an often diminutive statuette of a black horse attendant dressed in slave clothing, also called a Jocko. Groomsmen were often used as hitching posts. The origin of the groomsman is disputed, but it is accepted that they originated in the U.S. South. No longer as common since the civil rights movement. The "Cavalier" variation typically depicts a white figure. One legend has it that the first Groomsman was created at the commission of George Washington.
- Lighthouses: small-scale representations of local lighthouses are popular in coastal areas.
- Nest box/bird house: a small house for a bird normally made of wood and on a stake.
- Plastic flamingo: a generally lifesize replica of a pink flamingo. According to some, the origin of the plastic flamingo was in 1946 with the company Union Products in its "Plastics for the Lawn" product line. Their collection included dog, ducks, frogs, and a flamingo.
- Spinners: usually shaped like flowers with petals that spin in the wind. Variations include birds or insects with spinning wings.
- Statuary and outdoor sculpture
- Topiary specimens
- Whirligig: an often animalistic sculpture generally supported vertically by being pushed in the ground characterized by at least one rotating member often designed to appear as a bodypart of the sculpture.
- Windmill: a disconnected but free-spinning miniature, typically in the American Aermotor style having about a dozen metal vanes, or the traditional Dutch style having four wood vanes.
- Yard globe: a light-reflective sphere, as large as 12" in diameter or more and generally displayed on top of a support structure. Also called gazing globes or gazing balls.

== See also ==
- Ornament (architecture)
- Garden design
- Garden feature
- Landscape design
