= Garden office =

Office in a garden outbuilding

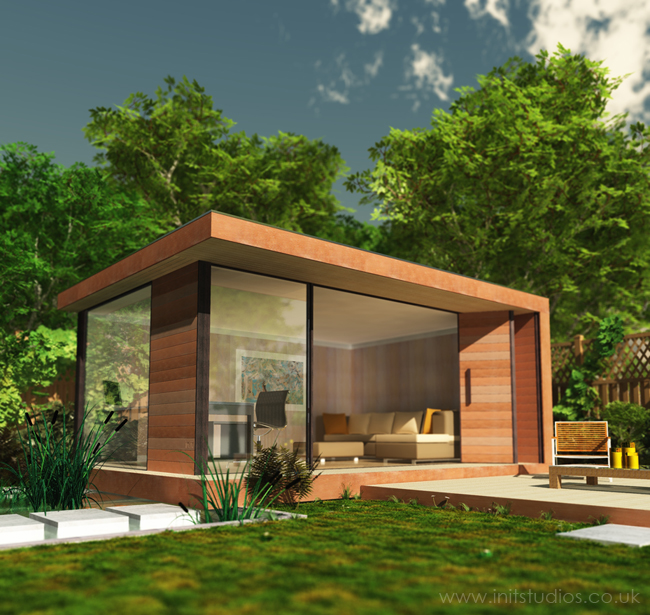

A garden office is an office in a garden outbuilding. This is usually separate to a house, being used as a dedicated office space by a remote worker or by a home-based business.

== Overview ==
In the UK, planning permission is not normally needed for a garden office if you are only using it as a home study and if it is similar in size and construction to a garden shed. A garden office used as a home study does not need planning permission as long as it is not more than 4 metres tall for a pitched roof, at least 2 metres from the property line and does not cover more than half of the garden area. If you are running a business from your garden office it will need planning permission regardless of its size or position within the garden. This is because working at home, in the garden, can cause a problem for neighbours. The cost will depend upon the facilities and can be between £5,000 and £60,000. Internet and telephone connections may be required and this can perhaps be achieved by use of a wireless network based in the main building.

== History ==
Garden offices boomed in popularity during COVID-19 lockdowns and working-from-home. They have been related to outbuildings such as sheds.

== Famous users ==
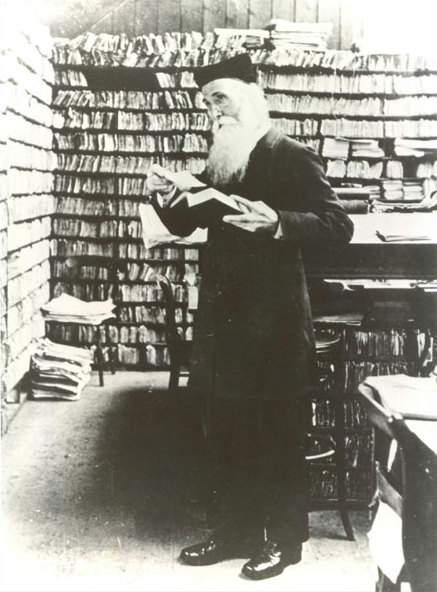
Sir James Murray in his Scriptorium in the garden of his house in Banbury Road, Oxford

- Sir James Murray
- Philip Pullman

== See also ==
- Garden buildings
