= Plastic flamingo =

Lawn ornament

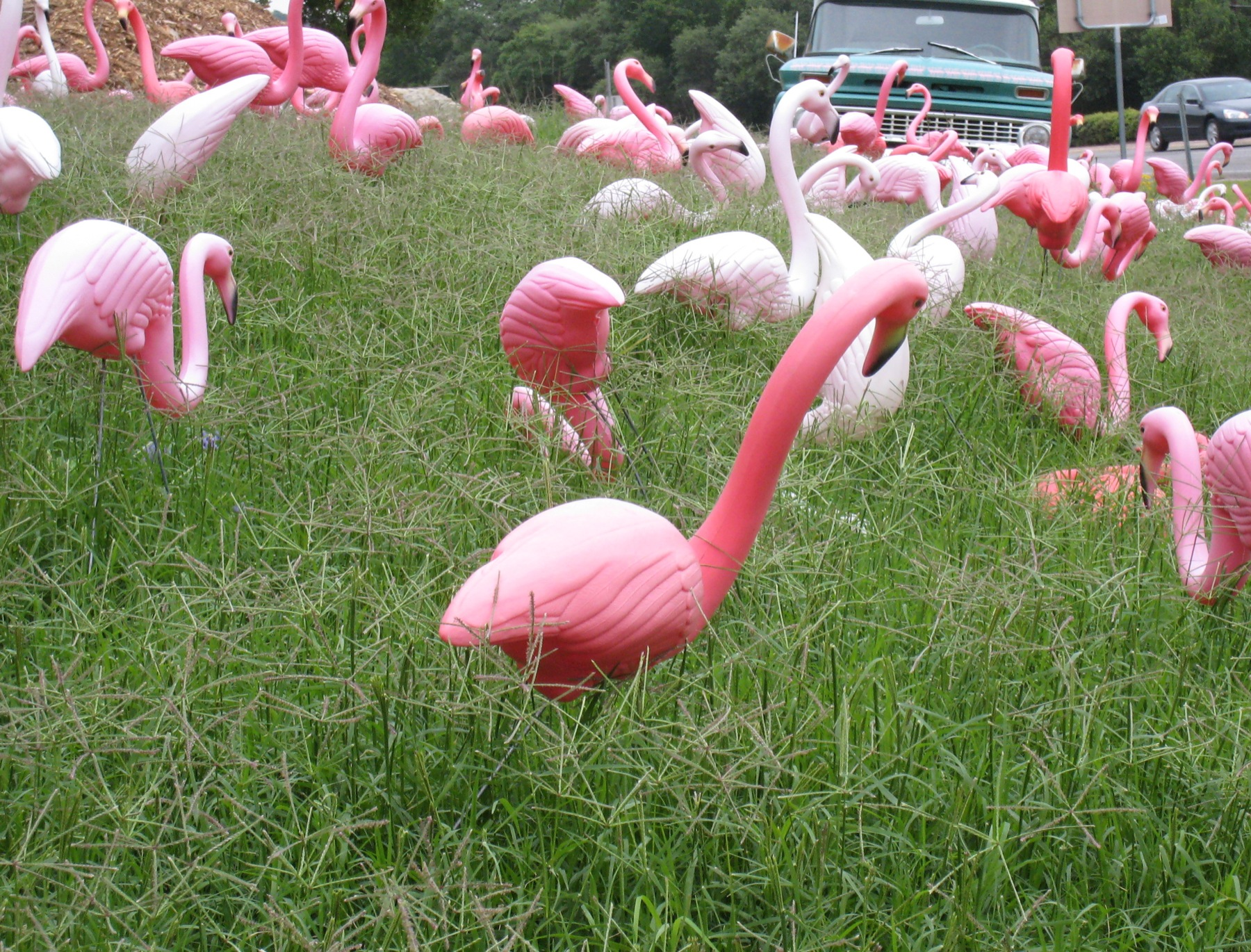
- Artist: Don Featherstone
- Year: 1957
- Type: Sculpture

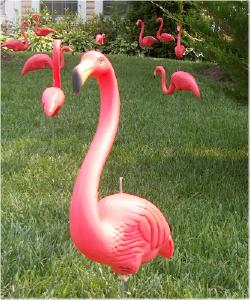

Pink plastic flamingos are a common lawn ornament in the United States. They were designed in 1957 by American artist Don Featherstone.

== History ==
=== Union Products ===
Featherstone designed the pink lawn flamingo in 1957, naming the first Diego. His lawn flamingo, mass-produced by his employer, Union Products, of Leominster, Massachusetts, has since become an icon of pop culture that won him the Ig Nobel Prize for Art in 1996. It has even spawned a spoof "lawn greeting" industry that installs flocks of pink flamingos on a victim's lawn in the dark of night. After the release of John Waters's 1972 movie Pink Flamingos, plastic flamingos came to be the stereotypical example of lawn kitsch.

Many imitation products have found their way onto front lawns and store shelves since then. Genuine pink flamingos made by Union Products from 1987 (the 30th anniversary of the plastic flamingo) until 2001 can be identified by the signature of Don Featherstone on the rear underside. These official flamingos were sold in pairs, one standing upright and the other with its head low to the ground, "feeding". Sometime after Featherstone's retirement in 2000, Union Products began producing birds without his signature. In December 2001, the Annals of Improbable Research (bestowers of the Ig Nobel prize) teamed up with the Museum of Bad Art to protest this omission in the form of a boycott, which resulted in its restoration. Union Products stopped production of pink flamingos upon its closure as of November 1, 2006.

=== HMC International LLC ===
HMC International LLC, a subsidiary of Faster-Form Corporation, purchased the copyright and plastic molds of Featherstone's original plastic flamingos in 2007. HMC sub-contracted production of the flamingos to Cado Manufacturing, Inc., a blow-molder located in neighboring Fitchburg, Massachusetts, who specialized in this type of production. In 2010, Cado Manufacturing purchased the copyrights and the entire Union Products product line, including the pink flamingo, from HMC.

== In culture ==
In the media and fiction, plastic flamingos are often used as a symbol of kitsch, bad taste and cheapness. The movie Pink Flamingos is named after them and helped them become an icon of trash and kitsch.

In 2009, the city of Madison, Wisconsin, Common Council designated the plastic flamingo as the city's official bird. The city's soccer club, Forward Madison FC, uses the plastic flamingo on its logo.

Some homeowners associations forbid the installation of plastic flamingos and similar lawn ornaments, and will fine offending owners, on the basis that such decorations lower the neighborhood's real estate values.

In 2024, as a political statement, some homeowners painted their pink plastic flamingoes blue, to indicate support for Harris-Walz over Trump-Vance in the presidential election. This was reported mainly in retirement communities in the southern US, where neighborhood associations often forbid the posting of political lawn signs.

== See also ==
- Artificial turf
- Lawn jockey
- Garden Gnome
- Concrete goose
