= Evergreen Cemetery (Bisbee, Arizona) =

- U.S. National Register of Historic Places
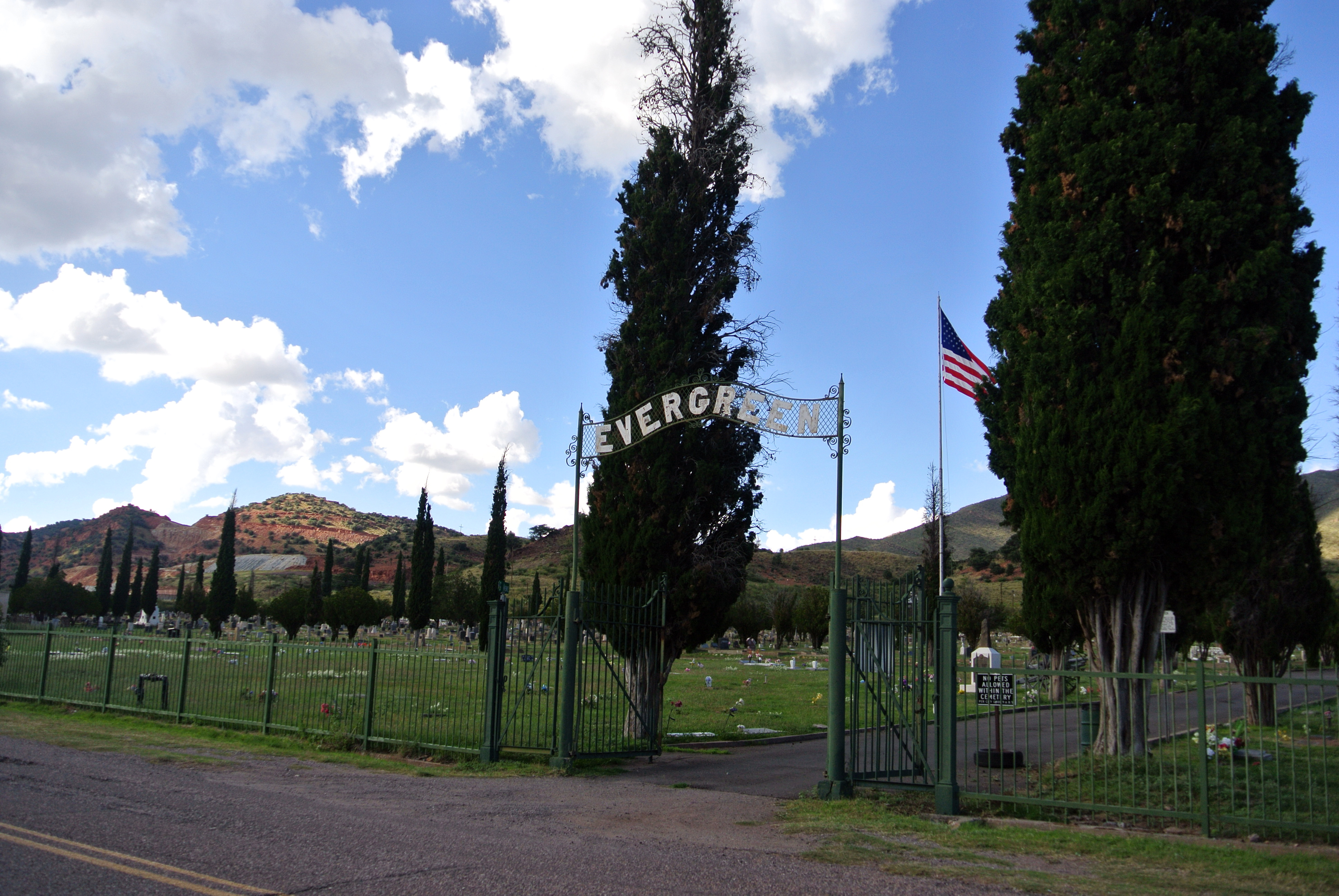
- The main entrance

- Location within Arizona Location within the United States
- Location: Bisbee, Arizona
- Coordinates: 31°25′54″N 109°53′26″W
- Area: 14.3 acres (5.8 ha)
- NRHP reference No.: 04001071
- Added to NRHP: October 7, 2005

Evergreen Cemetery is a cemetery in Bisbee, Arizona, located in the Lowell area of the city, along old U.S. Highway 80. It is also known as the Lowell Cemetery. It was officially established in May 1912, and contains over 10,000 graves, being the main cemetery for the city. It was added to the National Register of Historic Places on October 7, 2005.

== The cemetery ==
The cemetery is the main cemetery of Bisbee, Arizona, located in Lowell area of the city on old U.S. Highway 80, which is known in Bisbee as the Douglas Road. It was allocated for use as a cemetery in 1896, and was officially opened on May 3, 1912. Replacing Bisbee's original cemetery, which had been on Brewery Gulch Avenue in the main business district. While the estimates are approximately 10,000 graves, this may be low, due to mass burials, cremations, and unmarked infant burials.

The main access is off of Douglas Road, through a concrete and ironwork gate. There is a secondary smaller entrance off a north–south access road, which has a much smaller concrete and ironwork gate. Both gates are included in the historic site. There are numerous small roads that branch off the main and secondary roads throughout the cemetery, which is divided into fifty-one sections, thirty-four of which are included in the historic site. While there is no physical boundary demarcating the historic site, there is a conceptual boundary formed by those thirty-four sections. These sections vary in size, but the plots typically run in a north–south direction. They are:

- 13 East General
- 14 East General
- 15 Loyal Order of Moose
- 16 General
- 17 International Order of Odd Fellows
- 18 International Order of Odd Fellows
- 19 General
- 20 General
- 21 General/African American
- 22 County
- 23 East General
- 24 East General
- 25 General
- 26 Order of the Knights of Pythias
- 27 Ancient Order of United Workers
- 28 Loved Ones of L.O.O.M.
- 29 The Loyal of Order of Moose
- 30 Catholic
- 31 General
- 32 Northeast Catholic
- 33 Northeast Catholic
- 34 Catholic
- 35 Old Catholic
- 38 Northwest General
- 39 Baby
- 40 Northwest General
- 41 Northwest General
- 43 Improved Order of Red Men
- 44 Woodmen of the World
- 45 West General
- 46 Old Masonic
- 47 Old Benevolent and Protective Order of Elks
- 48 The Fraternal Brotherhood
- 49 The Fraternal Order of Eagles

The boundaries of each of these sections, like the broader boundary of the historical area of the cemetery, are not marked off by physical boundaries, but are due to historical burial patterns. Some are categorized by fraternal orders or religious beliefs, while others are due to linguistic differences or social status. These differences can be seen in the types of, or lack of, grave markers, as well as the languages and symbols on those markers. The markers reflect the diversity of the ethnicity and religions of the town over the years, as well as the fraternal orders present. For instance, Section 35, the older Catholic section, has markers with Latin crosses, sculptural elements and statements of devotion, while the nearby Section 48, known as the Fraternal Brotherhood, or Potter's Field, has no ornate markers, and quite a few completely unmarked graves.

The grave markers are made of many different materials, included concrete, marble, sandstone, granite, iron, wood, and pre-cast zinc. Some markers were made locally, while others were brought over rail through mail-order. There are several markers which are more elaborate, such as tombs, memorials, and nichos. One of the most prominent examples of these is the monument to George Warren, who was a prospector and the man the name of the town, Warren, Arizona, was named after. It is his image which appears on the State Seal of Arizona. Outside of the historic area of the cemetery, there are several structures which were constructed during the period of historical significance. When constructed, they were on the periphery, but have now been surrounded by more modern sections of the cemetery not included in the nationally recognized historic district. These include the Rosok Mausoleum, the Veteran's Memorial, and the icehouse complex. The latter was near the main entrance of the cemetery, with a portion of it being used as a sexton's residence at one time. Currently, it is not part of the cemetery and has been fenced off. The mausoleum is located at the northern end of the main north–south road through the cemetery, and the Veteran's Memorial is located in section 8. However both of these structures are not included in the Historic Site, since their architecture is anomalous to the rest of the cemetery.

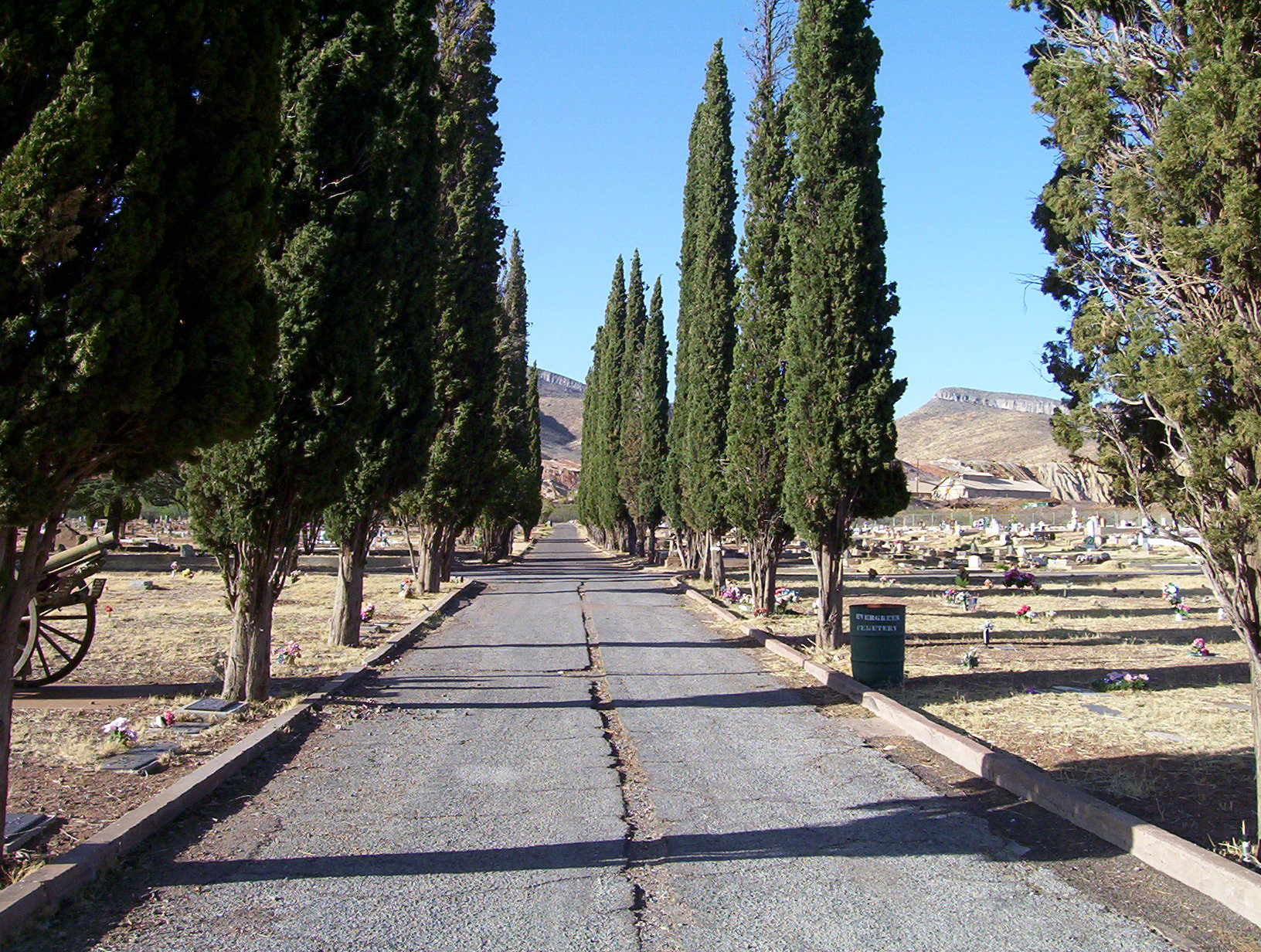
Evergreen Cemetery Bisbee

Throughout its history, Evergreen Cemetery was the recipient of a strong supply of water, pumped from the local mining operations of the Phelps Dodge Company. This abundance of water allowed the grounds to become lush and well-manicured. During the 1980s, however, that water supply dried up, and most of the vegetation which required watering was allowed to dry up as well. The primary access road is lined with Italian cypress (Cupressus sempervirens), over 80 years in age, which are intermixed with golden arborvitae (Thuja Platycladus). Plantings were done to separate the roadway from the gravesites. The loss of the abundant water supply, these plantings are also suffering. Other vegetation planted over the years include a smooth bark Arizona Cypress (Cupressus arizonica), desert hackberry (Celtis pallida), tree of heaven (Ailanthus altissima), and sporadic Yucca, Agaves, prickly pear, and Ocotillo desert cacti.

The cemetery is not a perpetual care cemetery, therefore several of the sections are in varying stages of decay and/or neglect. This has resulted in many of the oldest graves being in a condition beyond recognition. Also, another issue in the cemetery is one of settling. Beneath the graves, the mining operations have left a honeycomb of tunnels and mineshafts, totaling over 250 miles. Some of the gravesites have suffered from sinkage, and numerous cracks and fissures have developed, the longest being approximately 100 feet long, and 30 feet wide.
