= America in Bloom =

U.S. nonprofit organization

America In Bloom (AIB) is an independent, non-profit 501(c)(3) organization which promotes, recognizes, and celebrates community enhancement programs across the US. America in Bloom sponsors an annual nationwide competition between participating communities and provides related educational programs.

== Description of the organization ==
The US organization was founded in 2002 and modeled after long-standing programs in Europe: Ireland (Tidy Towns) Britain (Britain in Bloom and Regions) Scotland (Beautiful Scotland), Italy (Comune Fiorito), and originally France (Villes et Villages Fleuris), as well as Australia (Australia Tidy Town Awards) and Canada (Communities in Bloom, sponsors an international level competition). The US organization has grown to embrace more than 235 participating cities in 40 states.

America in Bloom is a grass-roots urban renewal program which provides a framework and is a catalyst for community organizations to work together for visible improvements. It offers one-on-one mentoring to participating communities and provides an extensive written evaluation detailing recommended improvements and enhancements. Its website provides educational materials related to the benefits of quality landscapes and more.

Communities receive top overall awards, based on their size. Within the entire body of participants, outstanding communities are also cited for their achievements in the areas of floral displays, landscaped areas, urban forestry, environmental awareness, heritage preservation, overall impression, and community vitality. Additional special awards vary each year and relate to a specific noteworthy community feature. Examples of these include: Most Attractive Naturalistic Landscape, Most Dynamic Transformation of a Downtown Streetscape, Most Beautiful Canopy of Trees, Public Art that Celebrates the Heritage of the Community, Best Program for Engaging Youth in their Community, Best Container Display, or Most Innovative Environmental Initiative Involving Water Conservation(special awards vary each year). For special awards entrants compete against all participating communities regardless of size.

The AIB program is designed to bring people from every demographic together to create meaningful, visible, constructive projects, by combining efforts of residents, businesses, and local government. These groups work on common goals in areas including: floral displays, landscaped areas, urban forestry, environmental awareness, heritage preservation, overall impression and community vitality.

Eligible program entrants include towns, communities, cities, neighborhoods of large cities, business districts, military bases, and college campuses.

== America in Bloom population category award winners (population ranges vary each year) ==
- Combined Locks, WI - less than 3,500 inhabitants
- Lewisburg, WV - 3,500 to 6,000
- Morro Bay, CA - 6,000 to 12,500
- Holliston, MA - 12,500 to 16,000
- Fairhope, AL - 16,000 to 20,000
- Venice, FL - 20,000 to 30,000
- Saratoga, CA - 30,000 to 40,000
- Lexington, KY - more than 40,000

== America in Bloom outstanding achievement award winners ==
- Edmonston, MD - environmental efforts
- Estes Park, CO - landscaped areas
- Fairhope, AL - urban forestry
- Holland, MI - floral displays
- Ottawa, IL - community involvement
- Santa Paula, CA - heritage preservation
- Winter Park, FL - overall impression

== Some previous winners (with reference to their AIB awards) ==
- Fayetteville, AR
- Columbus, IN
- Loveland, OH
- Lewes, DE

== Participating AIB Communities (past and present) ==
- Gallipolis, OH Gallipolis in Bloom | Facebook
- Morro Bay, CA Morro Bay in Bloom
- Tarboro, NC Tarboro In Bloom, Inc. - Home | Facebook
- Venice, FL Venice Area Beautification
- Brewton, AL Brewton in Bloom - Home | Facebook
- Estes, CO Estes Park in Bloom | Town of Estes Park
- Rehoboth in Bloom Rehoboth in Bloom - Home | Facebook
