= Concrete goose =

American lawn ornament

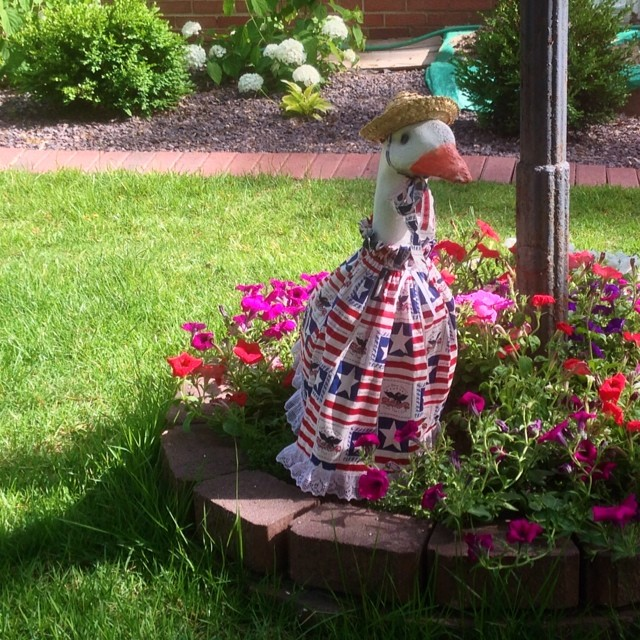
A lawn goose decorated for the Fourth of July

The concrete goose, also known as a porch goose or lawn goose, is a lawn ornament popular in the United States. Concrete geese reached the peak of their popularity in the 1980s, but are still common in the Midwestern United States. They experienced a revival in the 2020s.

It is not uncommon for owners of concrete geese to dress them in costumes for seasonal holidays, to match the weather, or just as decoration.

In the video game Untitled Goose Game, the player's goose character is challenged to impersonate a concrete goose.

== See also ==
- Plastic flamingo
