= Front Yards in Bloom =

Front Yards in Bloom Front Yards in Bloom: Winterscapes
- Abbreviation: FYiB
- Formation: 1999
- Type: recognition of attractive front yards in Edmonton.
- Legal status: active
- Purpose: beautification, public awareness, recognition, education
- Region served: Edmonton, Alberta, Canada
- Official language: English
- Parent organization: EHS, City of Edmonton
- Affiliations: Canada Post, Canadian Union of Postal Workers, Edmonton Federation of Community Leagues, Edmonton Native Plant Group, Sustainable Food Edmonton, Realtors' Association
- Volunteers: 150+
- Website: http://www.frontyardsinbloom.ca

Front Yards in Bloom is a recognition program that celebrates attractive front yards in Edmonton. Front yards are nominated by the general public, local gardeners, and postal workers. Volunteers with the Edmonton Horticultural Society then visit each nominated front yard to deliver their congratulations, post a "Front Yards in Bloom" lawn sign, and evaluate the yard. Awards are given at the annual Edmonton in Bloom Awards event.

Front Yards in Bloom: Winterscapes, which was introduced in 2014, is an extension of the successful summer FYiB program. This program encourages residents to celebrate winter outdoors and to keep their neighbourhoods looking beautiful year-round through winterscaping in their front yards in Edmonton. Front yard winterscape photo nominations are submitted by general public, neighbours, and postal workers. Photo judge volunteers with the partner groups then evaluate photo nominations. Awards are given at the annual Edmonton in Bloom Awards event.

Front Yards in Bloom (FYiB):

- celebrates public gardens and green spaces on private property,
- encourages people to beautify their yards,
- promotes growing and landscaping, and
- fosters community spirit.

This program not a competition because nominations are intended as congratulations from one neighbour to another. Front Yards in Bloom celebrates small pockets of beauty in Edmonton.

Although it's called Front Yards in Bloom, this includes side yards and corner gardens as well; any garden on private property that is open for the community to see (i.e. not fenced-in backyards).

== Evaluation and awards ==
Evaluation is based on curb appeal. Criteria include:

- contribution to the community
- landscape/winterscape design (such as colour, proportion & scale, diversity, texture & surfaces)
- maintenance and horticulture
- winterscaping features; and
- unique features or highlights.

Summer Program:

Volunteers select top yards from across the city (the "Awards of Merit"). Of those, six finalist yards are evaluated by VIP judges from the program partner groups. All of the top yards are recognized at the Edmonton in Bloom Awards. Awards are also given for the top Natural Front Yards (selected by the Edmonton Native Plant Group), Edible Front Yards (selected by Sustainable Food Edmonton), and Public Spaces (selected by the City of Edmonton's Great Neighbourhoods section).

The Edmonton Journal Readers' Choice Award is given based on the votes of readers for pictures of the top six yards.

Winterscapes Program:

Nominations can be submitted in one of three categories, which include Winter Yard, Winter Art, and Winter Play. Photo judges narrow down nominations to a group of Finalists. VIP judges from the program partner groups then select the top two nominations in each category.

=== Front Yards in Bloom and Community Leagues ===
The city-wide program has spawned local Front Yards in Bloom programs with Edmonton community leagues. Through these partnerships, participating community leagues help deliver signs and certificates, but they also help to recognize top yards in their own area. Community leagues can also contribute their own criteria, their own categories, and their own recognition ceremonies.

== Background and history ==
Front Yards in Bloom began in 1999 as a partnership program between the Edmonton Horticultural Society, Canada Post, and the City of Edmonton. The formula is modelled from Kitchener and has also run in Winnipeg and other Communities in Bloom cities across Canada.

Year	Comments	Nominations
1999	Beginning of Front Yards in Bloom	150+
2000	New category: Natural Front Yard.	300
2001	First "Edmonton in Bloom" community showcase.	
2004	Special Recognition by Communities in Bloom judges.	
2005	Nominations open to the public.	
2006		574
2007		468
2008	Pilot project with 7 community leagues.	655
2009	New category: Edible Front Yards. Partnerships with 20 community groups. Special recognition by national CiB judges.	1056
2010	Over 25 community league partners. Canadian Union of Postal Workers as official partner. "2010" decals on signs.	1523
2011	39 community league partners. Canadian Union of Postal Workers as official partner.	1532
2012	community league partners.	TBC
2013	46 community league partners. New logo, trademark, and visual identity for the program.	2345
2014	39 community league partners. New Public Spaces category. Introduced FYiB Winterscapes as a pilot program.	3492
2015	43 community league partners. Six new sponsors were invited to the program. A Galaxy Odeon commercial was among many new ways to promote the program.	4221

=== Connection to Communities in Bloom ===
Edmonton won the "over 300,000" population category at the national Communities in Bloom awards in 2009. The national judges gave special recognition to the Front Yards in Bloom program contributing to community beauty, community spirit, and connecting with the environment. Edmonton has participated in the Communities in Bloom (CiB) national program since 1995.

Leduc has also previously won the "20-50,000" population category and Strathcona County won the "international large population" category. - Top Honours Among Large Municipalities
