= Nicho =

Folk art of Central and South America

Nichos (singular: "nicho", meaning "niche") is a type of folk art popular throughout Central and South America, often devotional but sometimes merely quirky. Resembling dioramas, they are made from common household objects and craft material and traditionally combine elements from Roman Catholicism, mestizo spirituality, and popular culture. Nicho objects have different names in different places: they may be called retablo or have local names. Peruvian Retablos are a style that encompasses several different portable forms not discussed here.

In South America it is common to see decorative boxes called "nichos" set upon tables and pedestals to display religious icons. These boxes may serve as a religious altar (to mark a significant religious event) or to honor a patron saint. Common structural conventions include hinged doors, carved borders, and multiple panels. Within the box there is a central figure or object for whose honor the nicho has been created. They are usually painted with striking colors, often contrasting bright and dark, and tend towards garish.

== Forms ==
Nicho art originated as a popular adaptation of the Catholic retablo tradition of painting patron saints on wood or tin. Unlike the large, flat panels of retablo, nichos are small and built in shadow box style. Within the box there is a key object or central figure for whose honor or memory the nicho has been created. In addition to painted designs, nichos are decorated with all variety of images and objects from religious and popular culture, especially depictions of the Virgin Mary, saints, the sacred heart, figures from loteria, Dia de los Muertos characters and objects, and folk heroes.

== Materials ==
Nichos are made of objects that can be easily purchased or scavenged in the home or community. The media are characteristically humble for a religious object, especially compared to the typically ornate icons of the Catholic Church. The shadow box itself is easily converted from a cigar box or other mass-produced wooden container, but can also be constructed from any lightweight wood, recycled tin, or glass. The colorful designs on the box and borders are created not only with paint, but also with sequins, glitter, chain, thread or rope, paper mache, and any small bric-a-brac. Other ornaments within nichos include milagro charms, beads, stones, nails, and other manufactured and found objects.

== Themes ==
Thematically, traditional nichos are part or extensions of household altars, and depict patron saints, ancestors, or an ex-voto. They can act as shrines, protection, or devotional objects, and may be part of active religious practice. The most common central figure is the Virgin Mary, and in Central America especially the Virgin of Guadalupe. Contemporary nichos have expanded into more non-traditional subject matter, including the secular or the humorous, but continue to represent themes and figures in popular Latin American culture.

== See also ==
- Bathtub madonna
