= Grillkota =

Scandinavian grillhouse

A Grillkota (literally grill goahti) is a small structure with seating centred around an open wood or charcoal-fired grill, originating among Sámi reindeer herders in Scandinavia. They may feature as a communal facility, at camping locations, or as a garden feature.

Scandinavian grillhouses are usually built in octagonal or hexagonal shapes with glazed doors and large removable windows. Grilltables and chimneys are made in different shapes and the materials used range from granite stone to stainless steel.

Scandinavian grillhouse

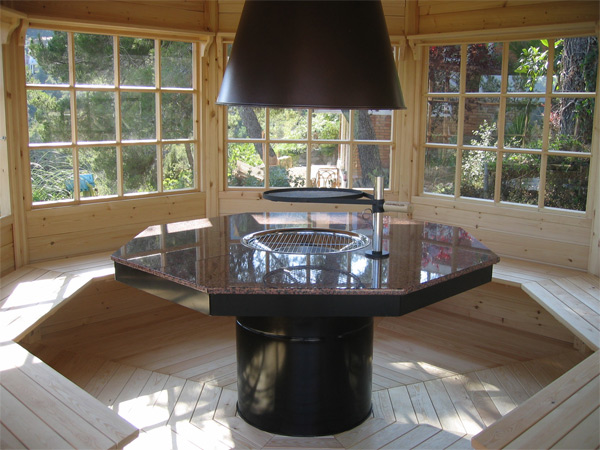
Grillhouse interior

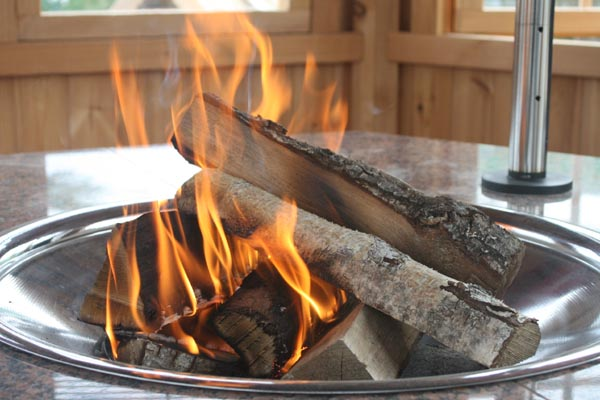
Grillhouse fire
