= Bathtub Madonna =

Artificial grotto typically framing a Roman Catholic religious figure

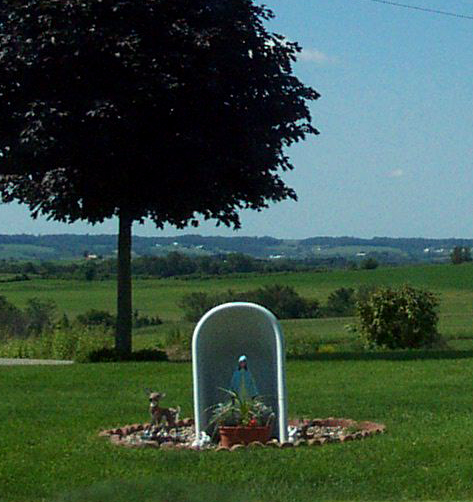
A bathtub madonna in a front yard in Sherrill, Iowa

A bathtub Madonna (also known as a lawn shrine, Mary on the half shell, bathtub Mary, bathtub Virgin, and bathtub shrine) is an artificial grotto typically framing Our Lady of Lourdes, commonly found in Catholic regions of the U.S.

== Variations ==
These shrines most often house a statue of the Blessed Virgin Mary but sometimes hold the image of another Catholic saint or of the Sacred Heart. Infrequently, more than one Saint is represented.

While often constructed by upending an old bathtub and burying one end, similar designs have been factory produced. These factory produced enclosures sometimes have decorative features that their recycled counterparts lack, such as fluting reminiscent of a scallop shell.

The grotto is sometimes embellished with brickwork or stonework, and framed with flowerbeds or other ornamental flora. The inside of the tub is frequently painted a light blue color, particularly if the statue is of Mary because of her association with this color.

Somerville, Massachusetts, a city which has traditionally had sizable Italian, Irish, Portuguese and (more recently) Brazilian populations, has over 350 Catholic yard shrines in a town of about four square miles, with more than 40 in actual bathtubs.

== See also ==
- Wayside shrine
- Nicho
- Saint symbolism
