= List of garden types =

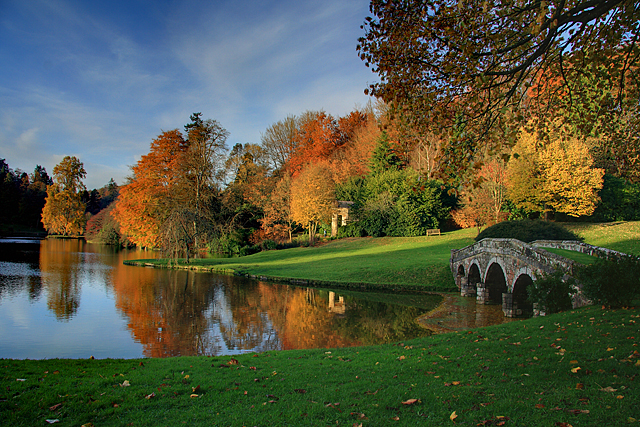
Autumn colours at Stourhead, an English landscape garden

A wide range of garden types exist. Below is a list of examples.

== By country of origin ==
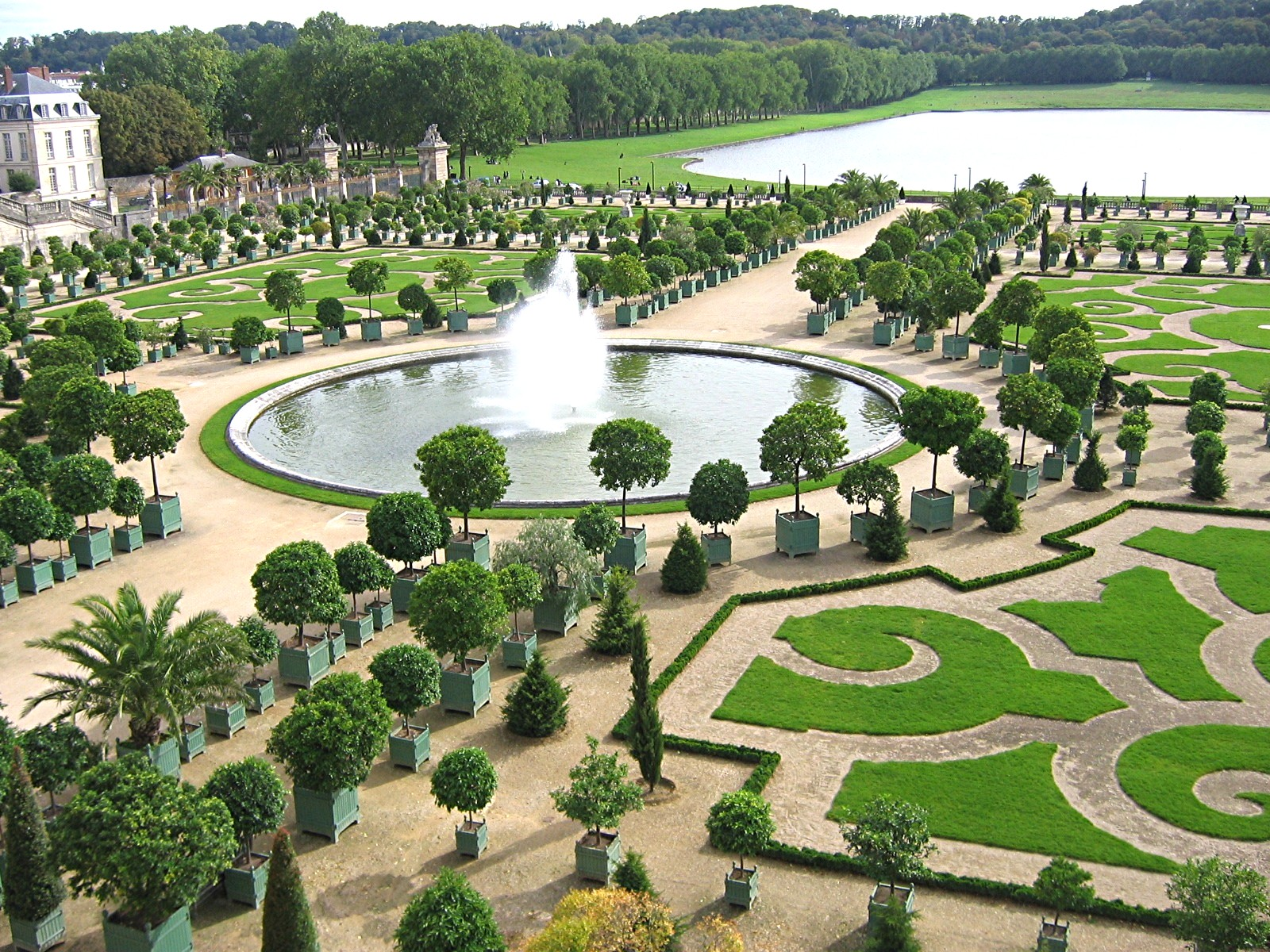
The Orangerie in the Gardens of Versailles with the Pièce d’eau des Suisses in the background (French formal garden)

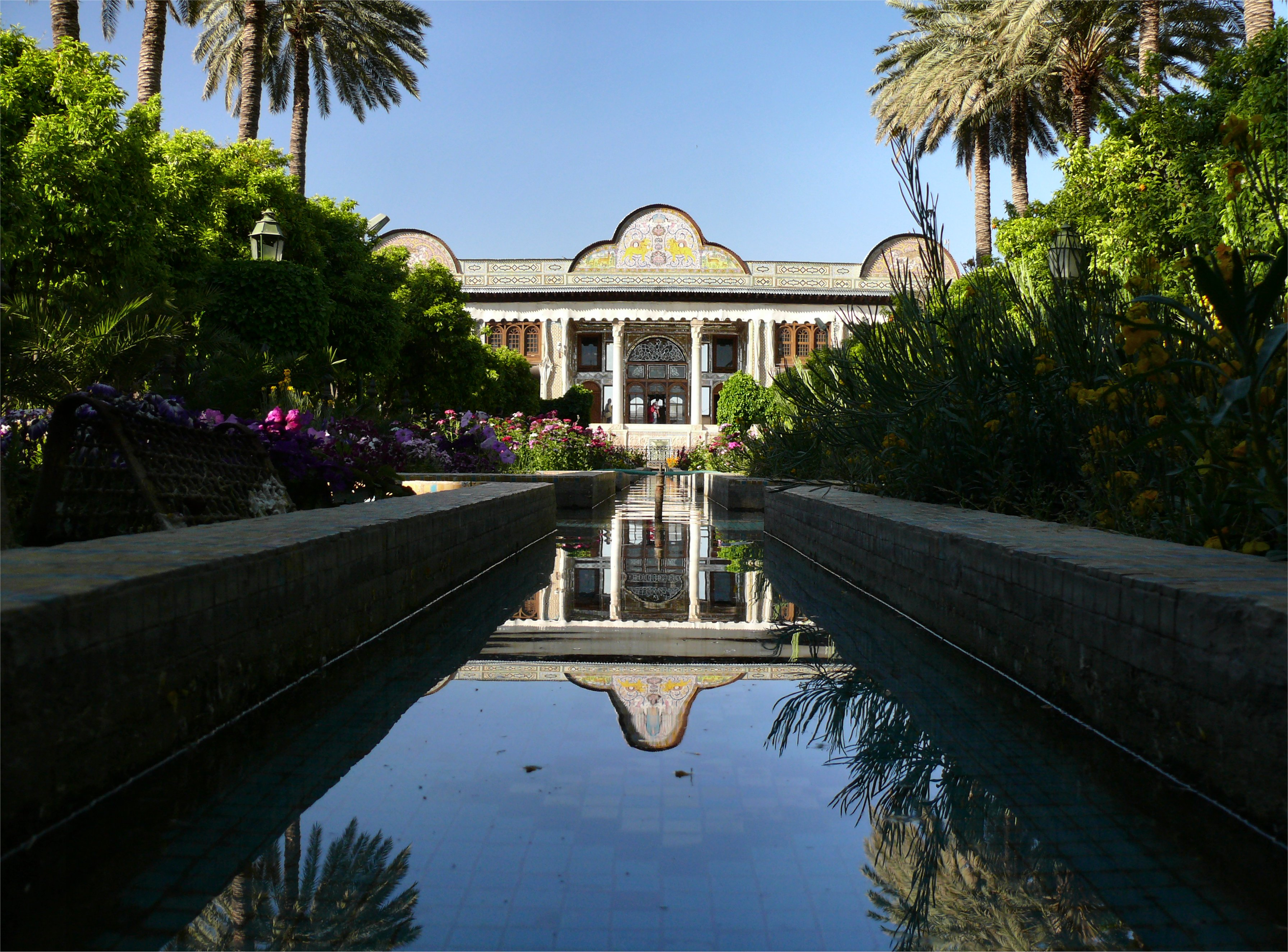
Reflection of the Bagh-e Narenjestan (orange garden) and the Khaneh Ghavam (Ghavam house) at Shiraz, Iran (Persian garden)

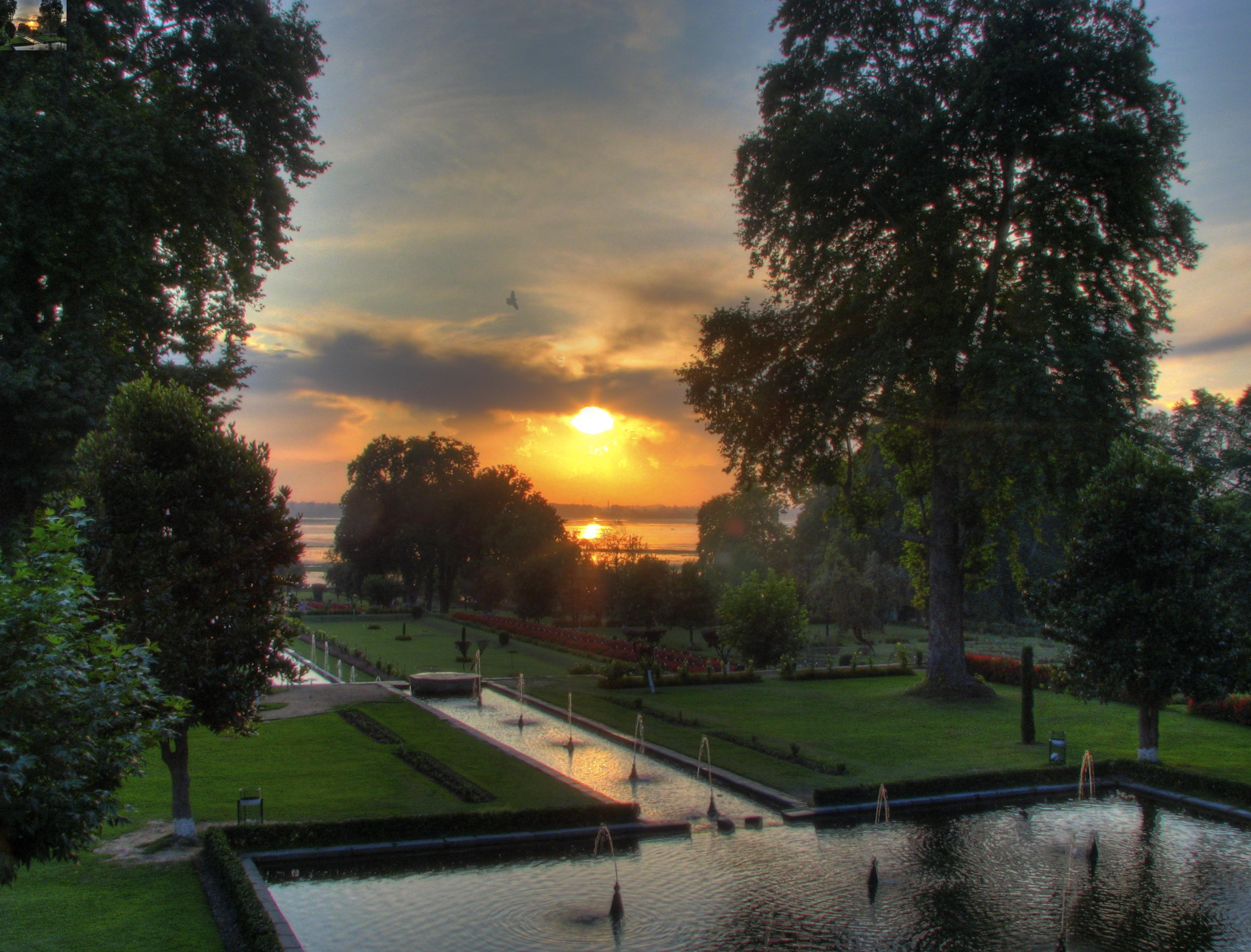
Nishat Bagh, terrace garden at Srinagar, Jammu and Kashmir (Mughal Gardens)

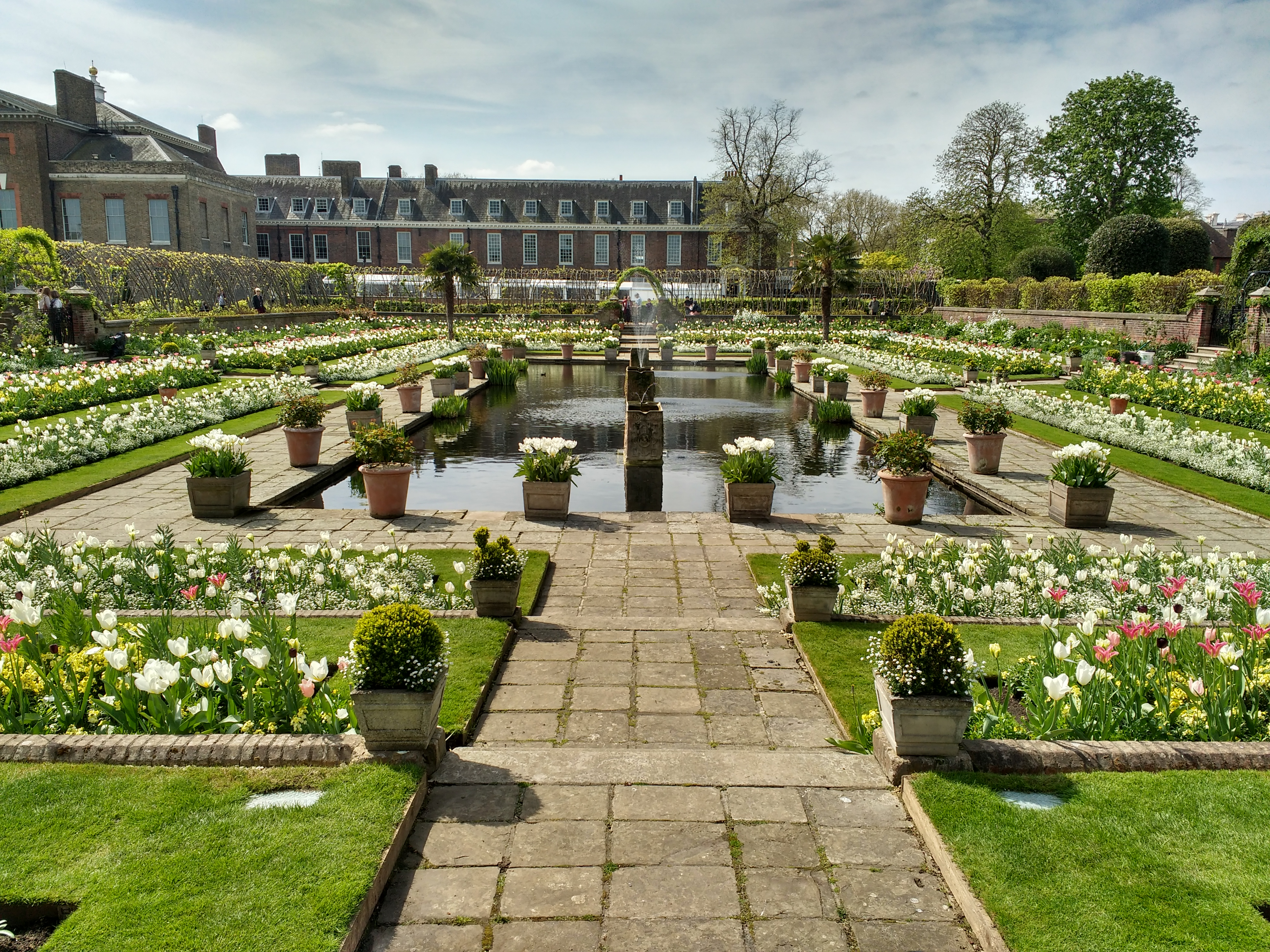
White Garden at Kensington Palace, a Dutch garden planted as a Color garden

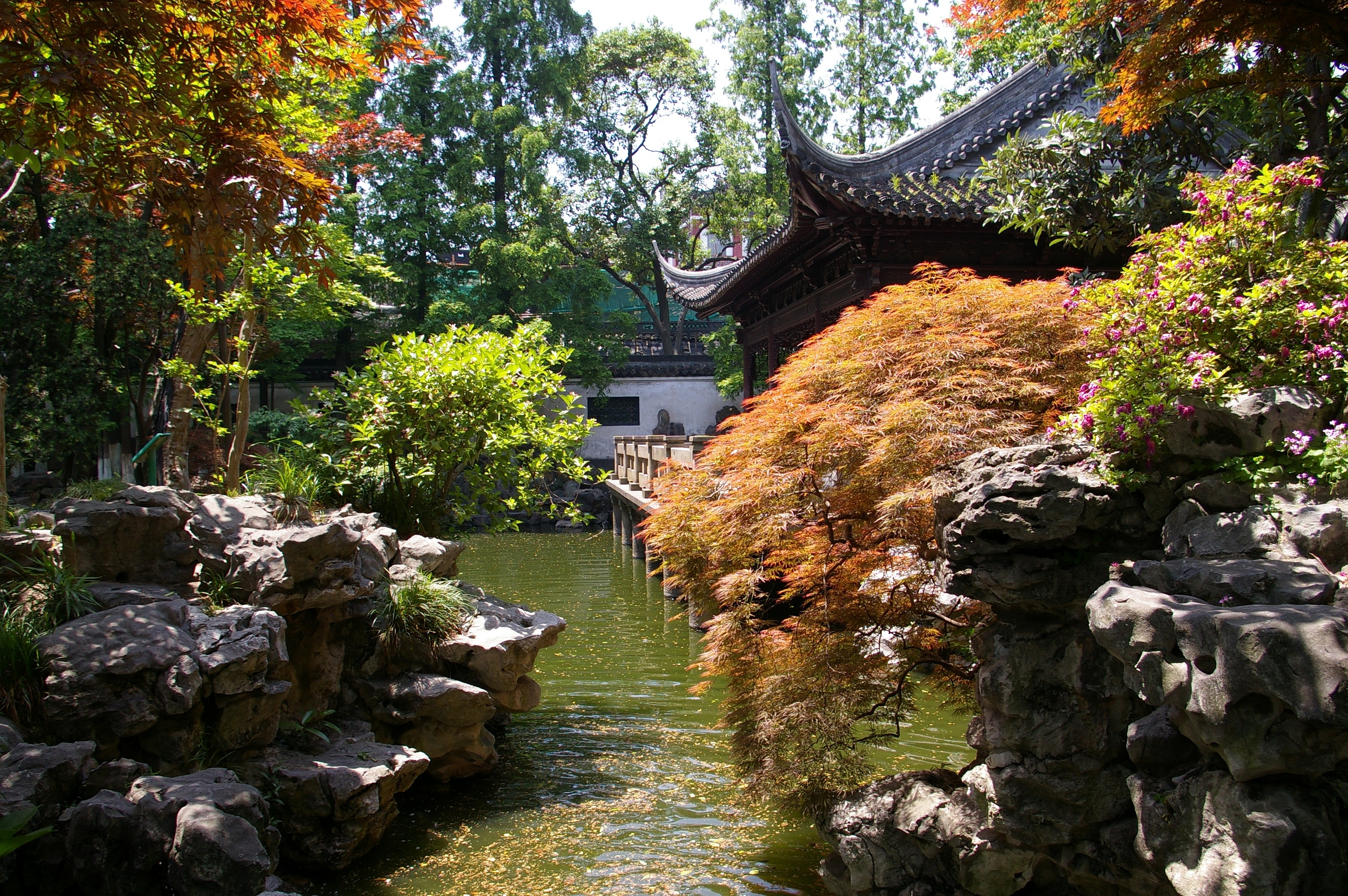
The Yuyuan Garden in Shanghai, China (created in 1559) shows all the elements of a classical Chinese garden – water, architecture, vegetation, and rocks.

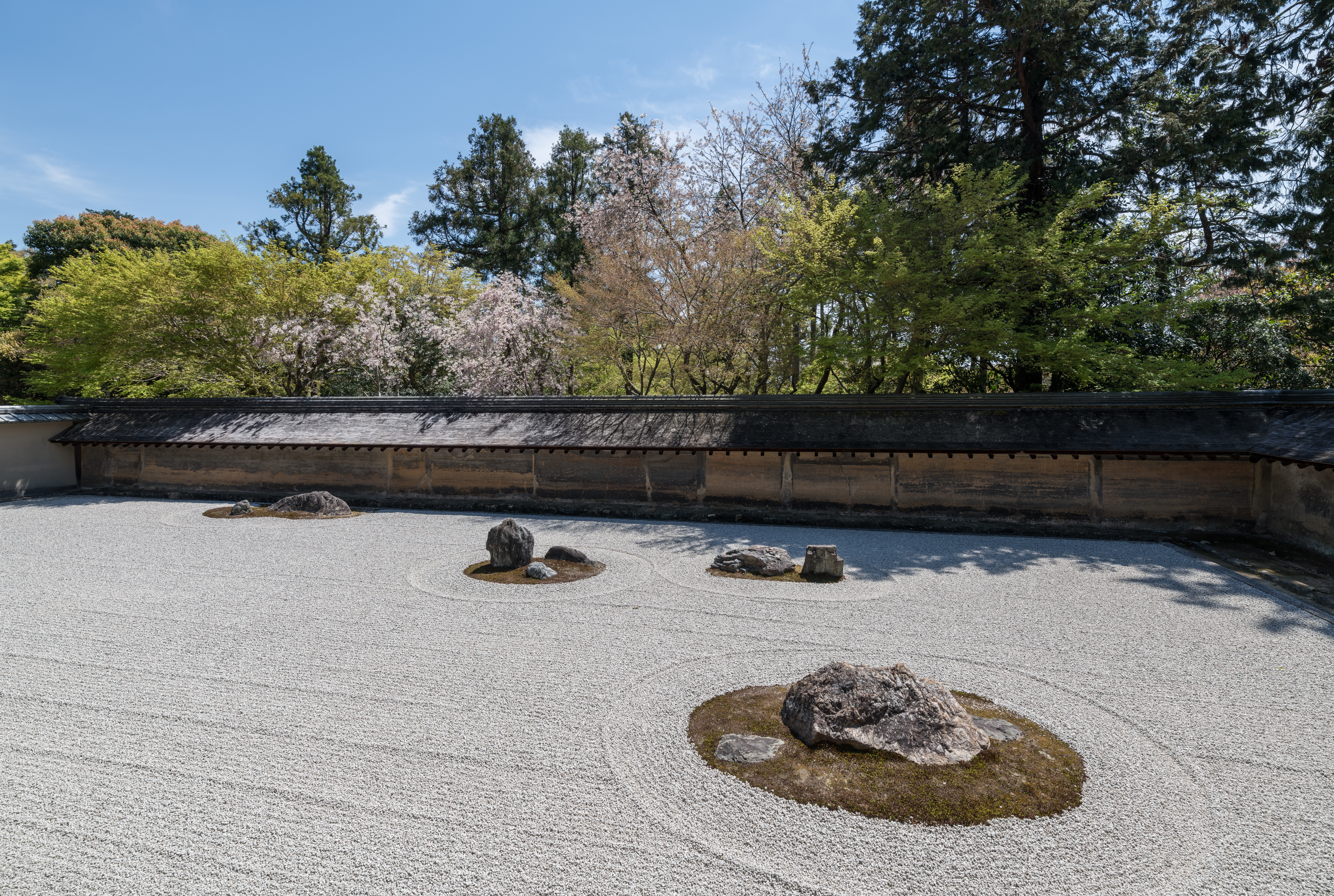
Ryoan-ji (late 15th century) in Kyoto, Japan, the most famous example of a Zen rock garden

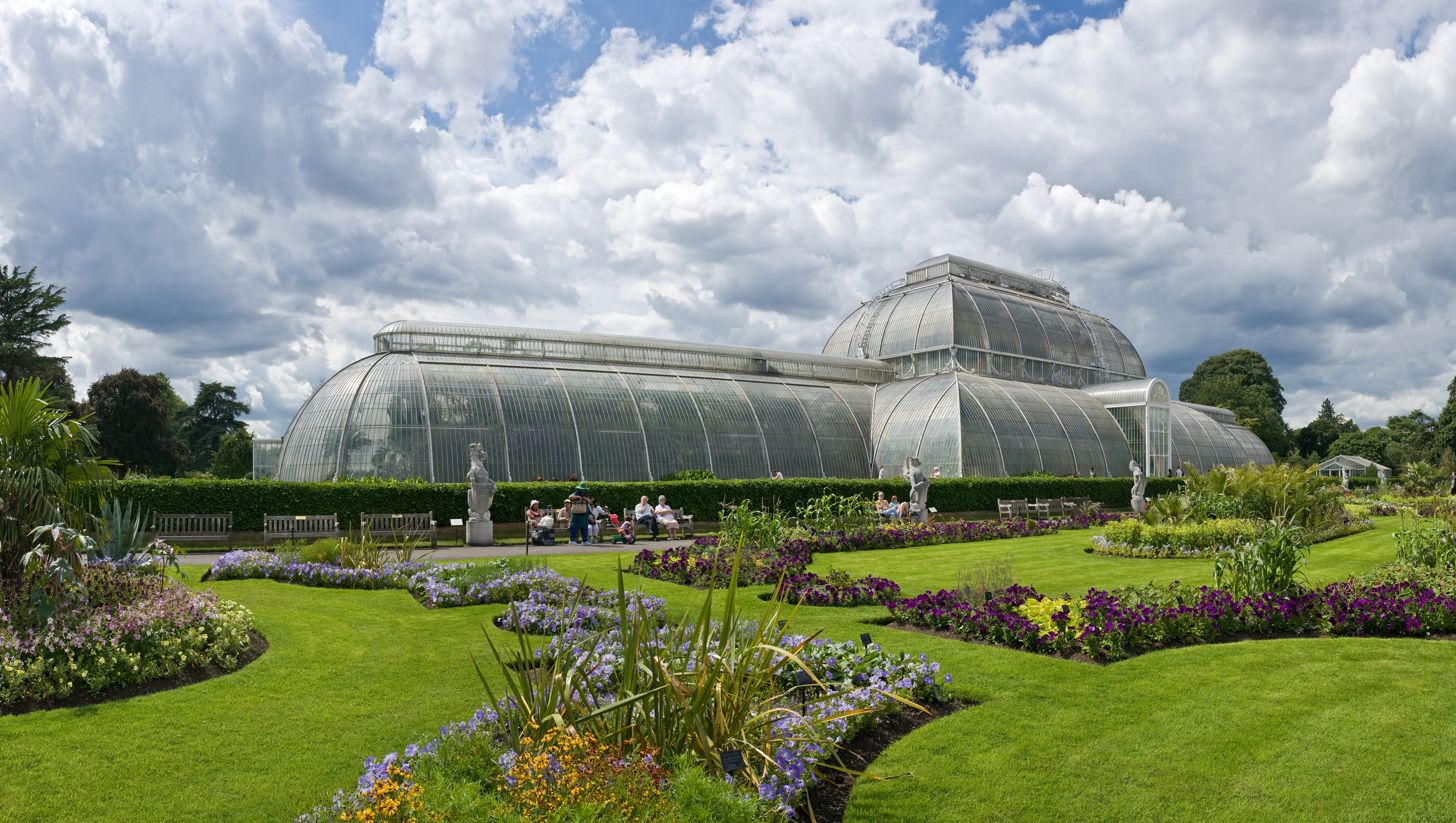
Palm House at the Royal Botanic Gardens, Kew, London

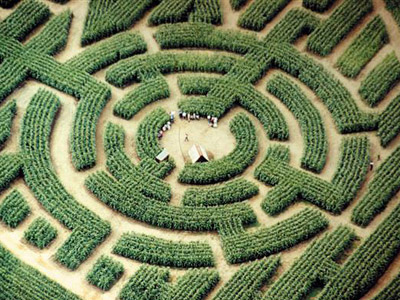
Labyrinth maze of Barvaux, Durbuy, Belgium

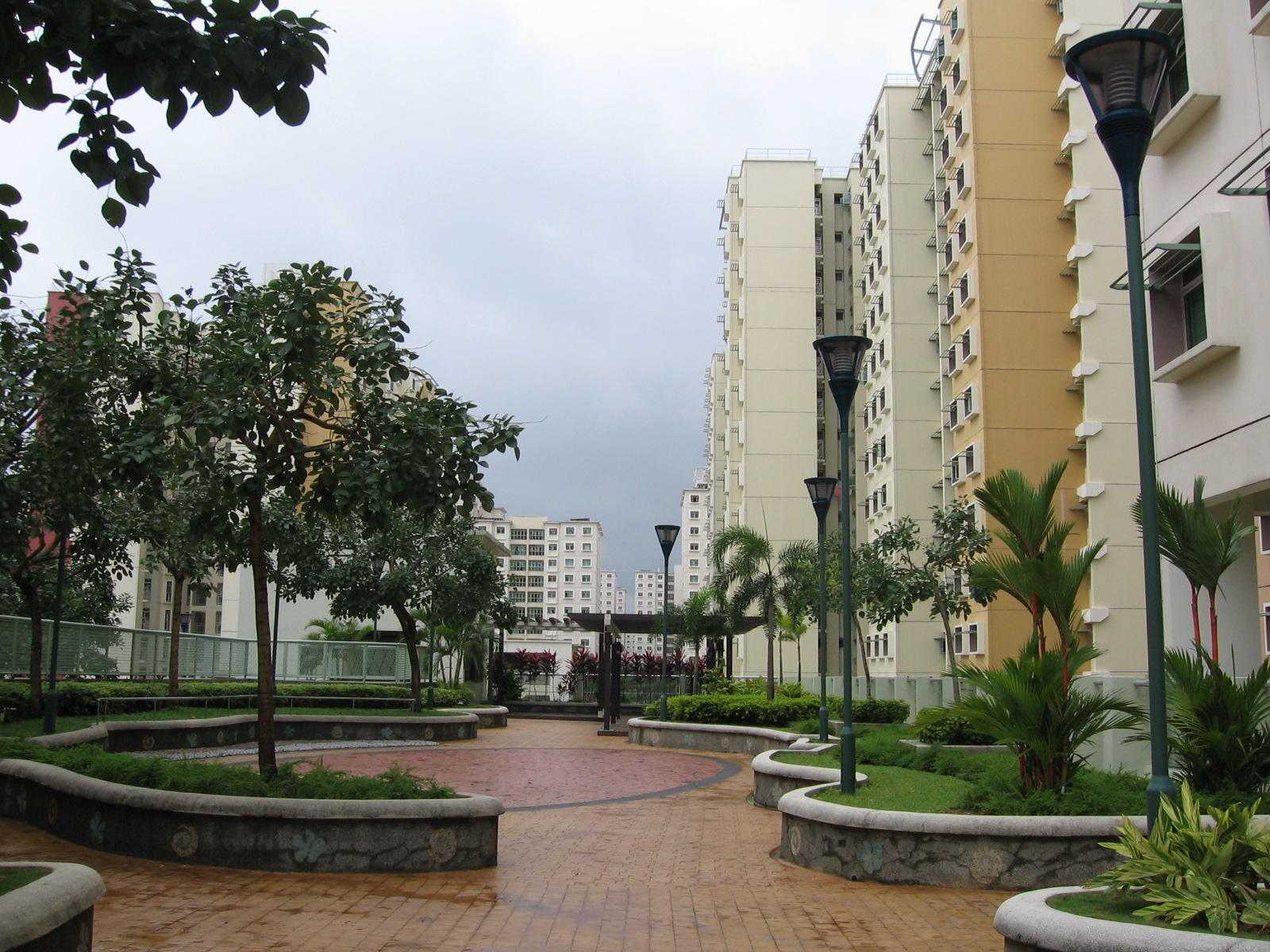
Roof garden on the top deck of a multi-storey car park, Edgedale Neighbourhood, Punggol, Singapore

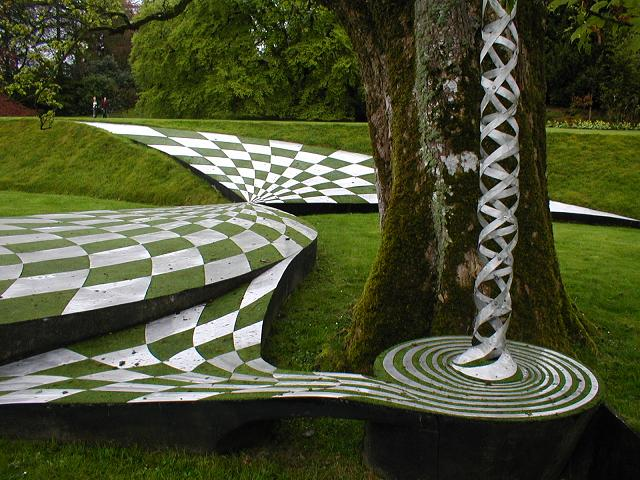
The Garden of Cosmic Speculation, a sculpture garden in Dumfriesshire, Scotland

- Chinese garden
  - Cantonese garden
  - Sichuanese garden
- Dutch garden
- Egyptian garden
- English garden
  - English landscape garden
- French garden
  - French formal garden
  - French landscape garden
  - Gardens of the French Renaissance
- German garden
- Greek garden
- Indian garden
  - Mughal garden
- Italian garden
  - Italian Renaissance garden

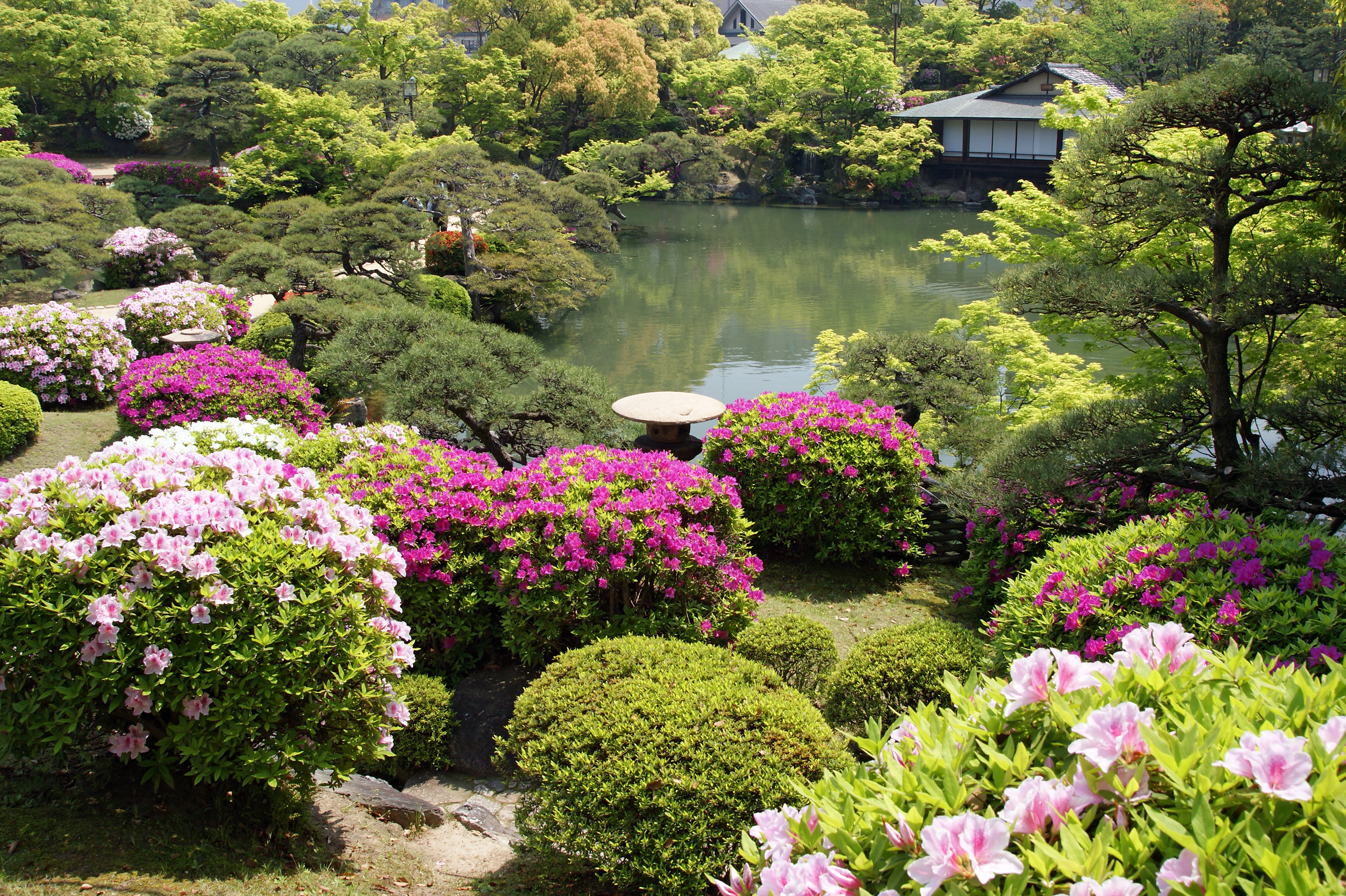
Sōraku-en gardens (Japanese garden)

- Japanese garden
  - Japanese dry garden
  - Japanese tea garden
  - Tsubo-niwa
- Korean garden

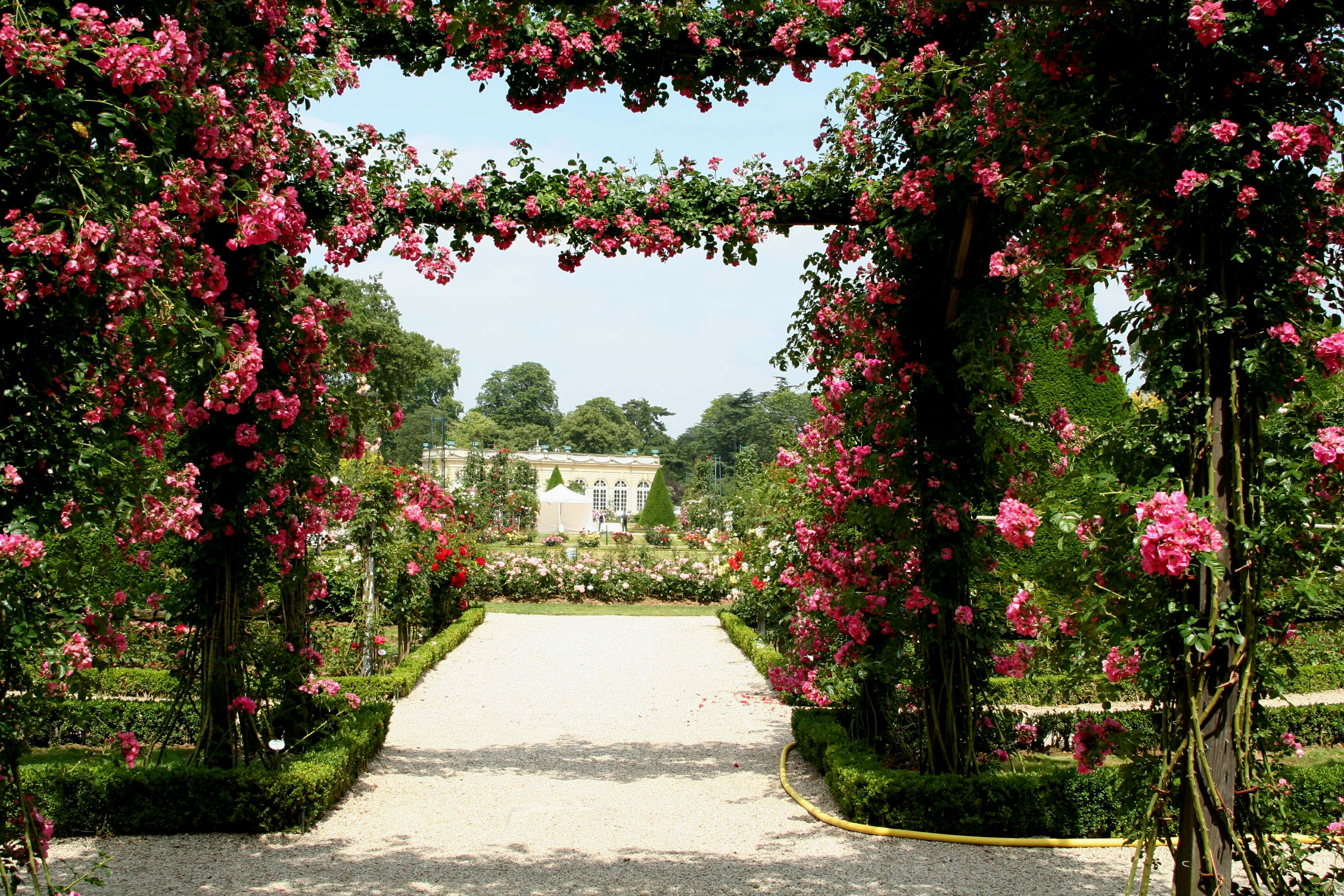
Parc de Bagatelle, a rose garden in Paris

- Persian garden
  - Charbagh
  - Paradise garden

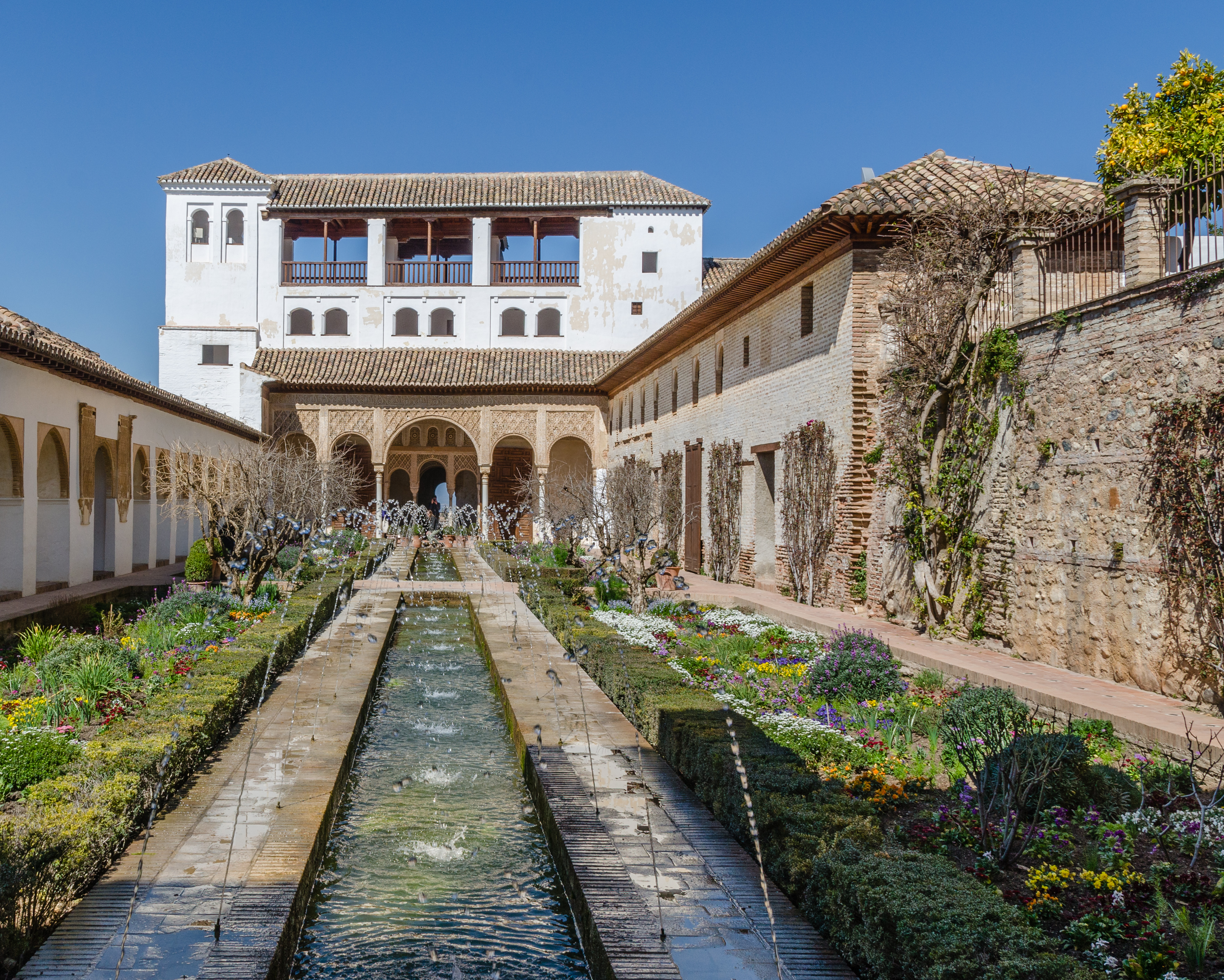
Jardín del Generalife de Granada (Spanish garden)

- Spanish garden
  - Andalusian Patio
- United States garden
  - Colonial Revival garden

== By historical empire ==
- Byzantine gardens
- Mughal gardens
- Persian gardens
- Roman gardens

== In religion ==
- Bahá'í gardens
- Biblical garden
- Islamic garden
- Mary garden
- Sacred garden

== Other ==
- Aquascaping
- Back garden
- Baroque garden
- Bog garden
- Bosquet
- Botanical gardens
  - Alpine
  - Arboretum
  - Palmetum
- Bottle garden
- Butterfly gardening
- Cactus garden
- Charbagh
- Color garden
- Community garden
  - Allotment (gardening)
  - Communal garden
  - Garden sharing
- Container garden
- Cottage garden
- Energy-efficient landscaping
- Ferme ornée
- Fernery
- Flower box
- Flower garden
- Forest gardening
- Front garden
- Garden room
- Garden square
- Hanging garden (cultivation)
- Herb gardens
- Hòn Non Bộ
- Hortus conclusus
- Intercultural Garden
- Keyhole garden
- Kitchen garden
- Knot garden
- Maze
  - Hedge maze
  - Turf maze
- Memorial garden
- Monastic garden
- Moon garden
- Moss garden
- Native gardening
- Organic horticulture
- Pattern gardening
- Permaculture
- Physic garden
- Playscape
- Paradise garden
- Pleasure garden
- Poison garden
- Pollinator garden
- Rain garden
- Raised bed gardening
- Rock garden
- Roof garden
  - Green roof
  - Subtropical climate vegetated roof
- Rose garden
- School garden
- Sculpture garden
  - Sculpture trail
- Sensory garden
- Shade garden
- Shakespeare garden
- Stumpery
- Sustainable gardening
- Tea garden
- Telegarden
- Therapeutic garden
- Terrace garden
- Trial garden
- Tropical garden
- Tropical horticulture
- Underground farming
- Upside-down gardening
- Urban horticulture
- Vertical garden
- Victory garden
- Walled garden
- Water garden
- Wildlife garden
- Window box
- Winter garden
- Woodland garden
- Xeriscaping
- Zen garden

== See also ==
- History of gardening
- Landscape design
- Category:Garden features
- Category:Types of garden
