= Monochromatic garden =

Type of garden focused on multi- or monochromatism

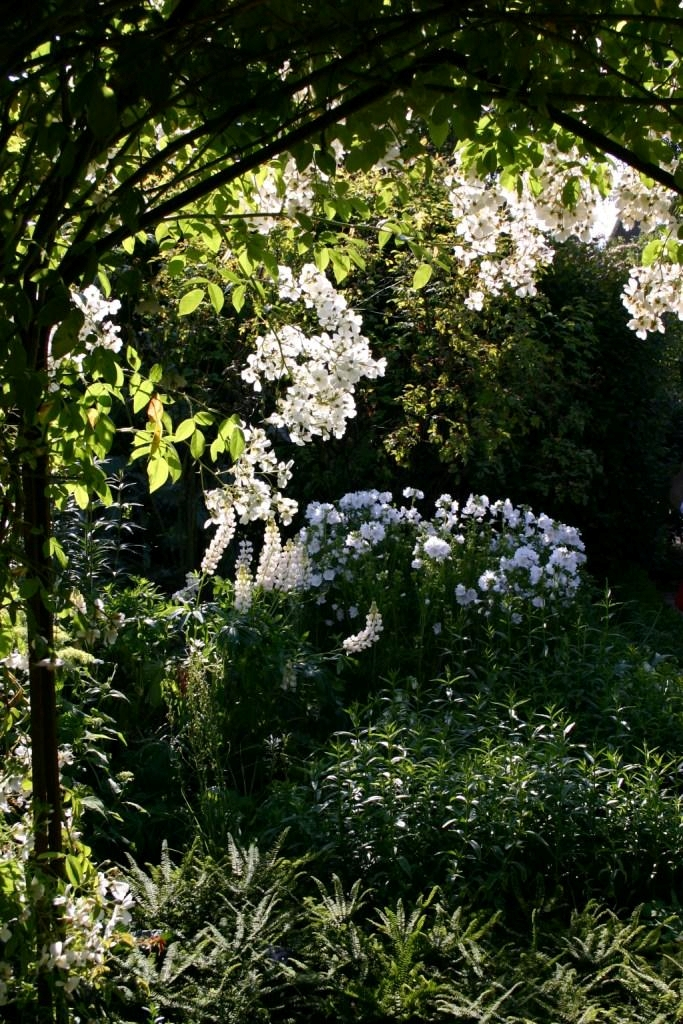
The White Garden at Sissinghurst

A monochromatic garden is a garden in which a single color is highlighted.

== Single-color gardens ==
Such a garden is planted so that it overwhelms the observer with a single color. While this may seem a rather bland approach at first, such gardens were made popular by the work of famous garden designers such as Gertrude Jekyll and Vita Sackville-West. Sackville-West, for example, created what may have been one of the most famous single-color gardens, the White Garden room of the Sissinghurst Castle Garden.

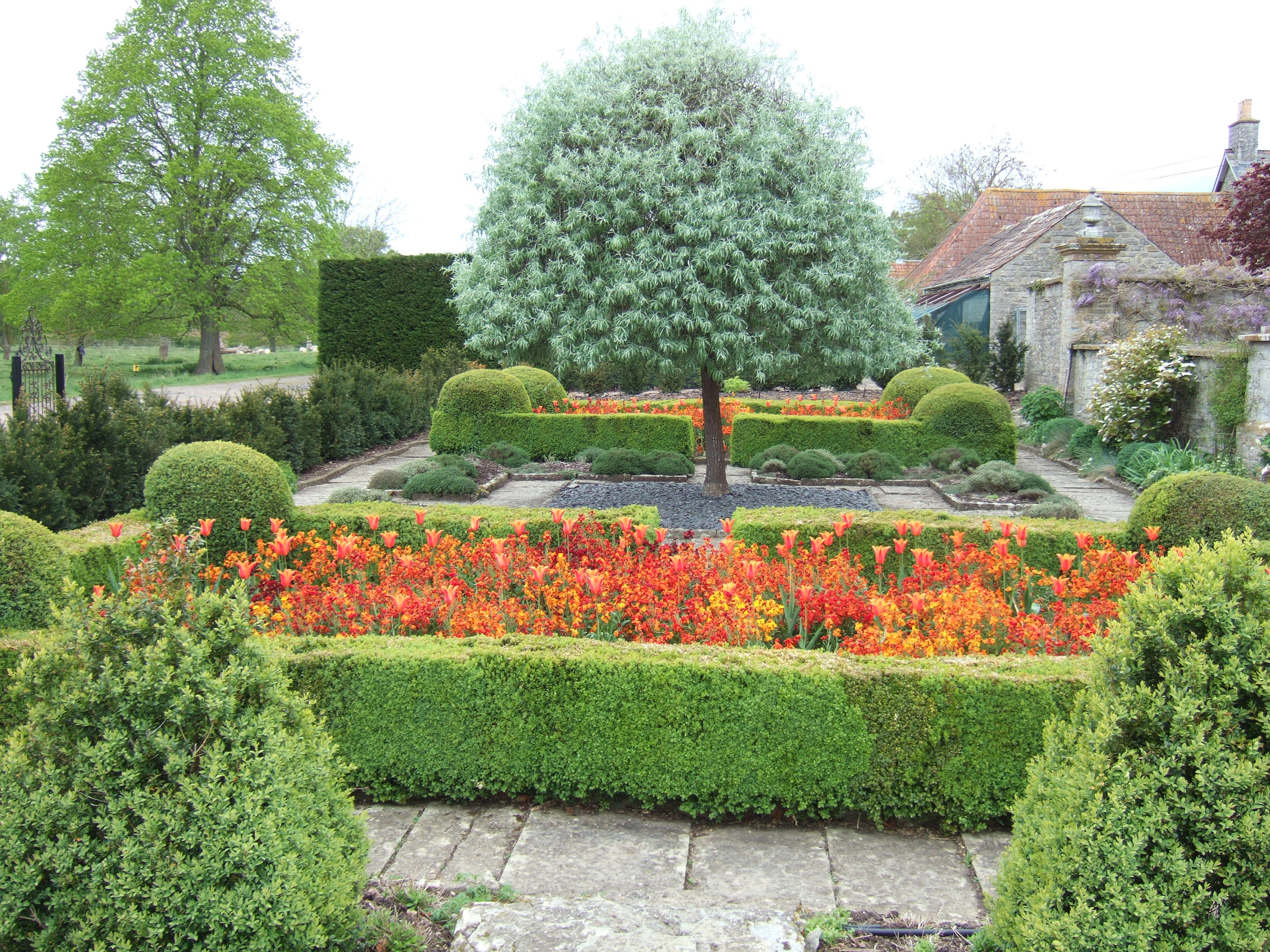
The red garden at Lytes Cary

Many single-color gardens use flowers of different shades, such as light yellow and deep gold, or a range that includes dark burgundy, bright scarlet, and also pink for a red garden. (A similar idea uses analogous colors, such as purple, red, and orange, rather than a single color.) Plants with colored leaves, such as silver leaves or plants with variegated foliage for a white garden, might also be included.

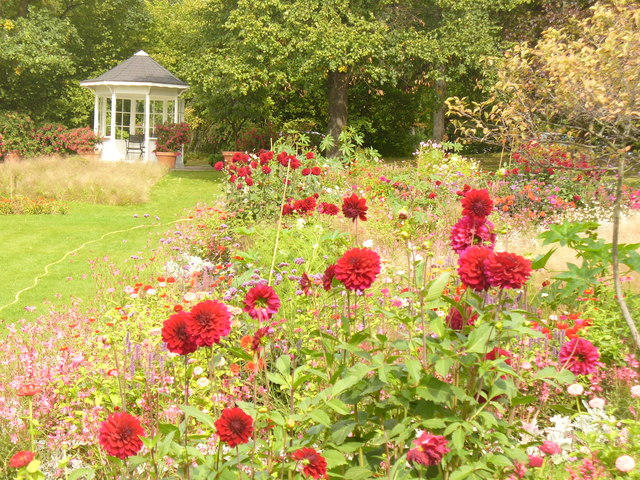
Britzer Garten has two monochromatic gardens, one in red and another in yellow.

The color for a monochromatic garden may be chosen for any reason, including to fit a small garden, as part of a clean, contemporary design, or to highlight a favorite color. Another possibility is an all-green garden, which may feel peaceful or harmonious. A monochromatic edible garden is possible, but more challenging to design than a flower garden in any color except green. Yellow variegated leaves can be difficult to include in a multi-colored garden, but they blend easily into an all-yellow garden, such as all-yellow Gold Border garden at Wave Hill in New York.

Beyond the choice of color, single-color gardens are designed with a variety of types and sizes of flowers as well as plants of different heights, shapes and textures. Other elements of the garden, such as pathways, walls, and furniture, may match or contrast with the chosen color.

=== White garden ===
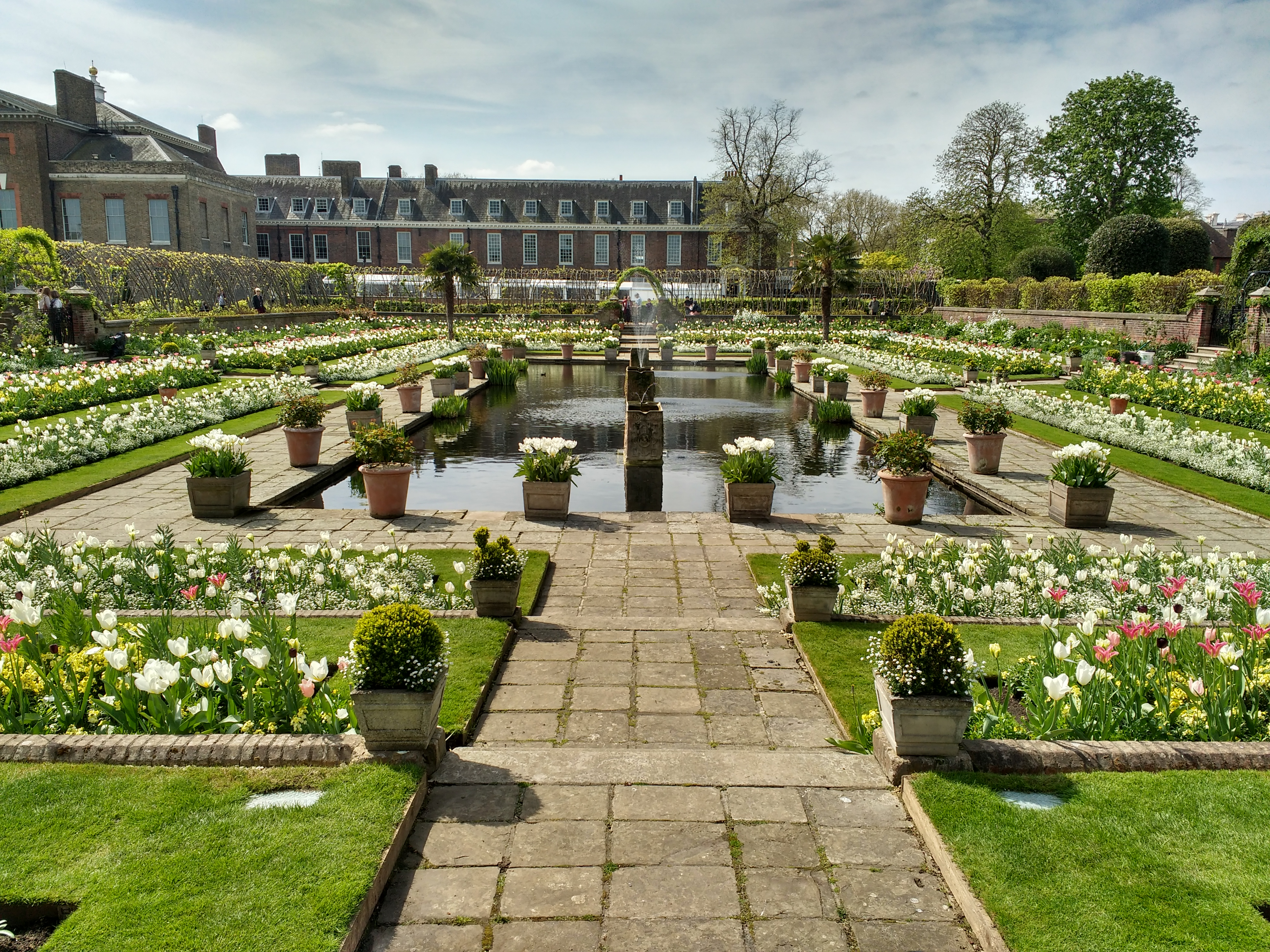
White Garden at Kensington Palace

A white garden is a feature garden composed of plants that produce white flowers and spathes as well as plants with a white or silvery cast to their foliage. The white garden is a variant of the color garden. The most essential feature of the white garden is its unity of color.

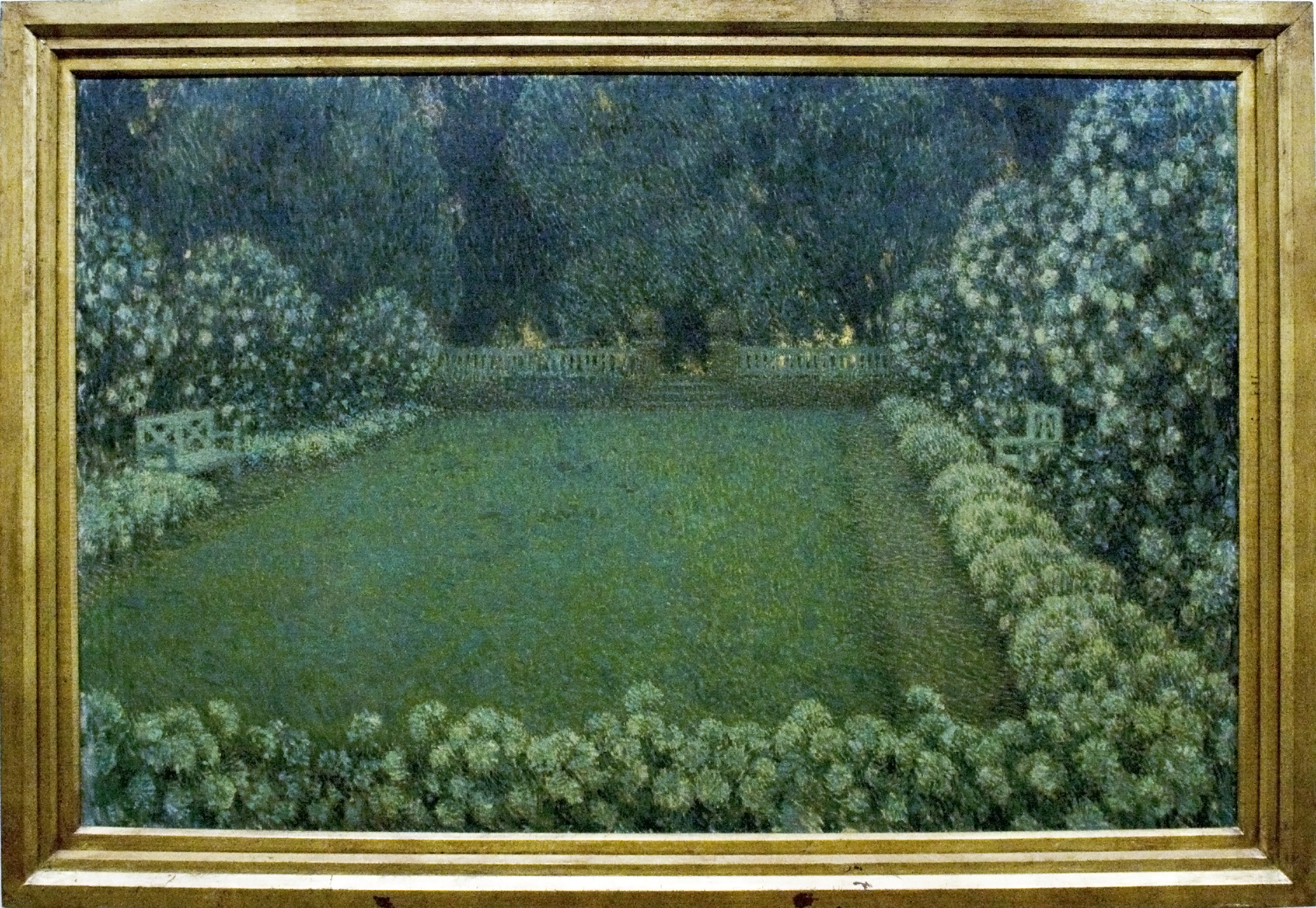
1912 painting by Henri Le Sidaner of a white garden at dusk

The white garden is an informal gardening style that is similar in design to the English cottage garden. The open and informal design creates associations with romance, peace, and elegance. The white flowers are not usually placed in clusters, but spread throughout the garden's green areas, creating a natural look and feel. The mildly dense placement of white flowers creates a luminescent sight that is especially powerful in the twilight. Because of this effect, they are sometimes called moon gardens.

The white flowers in a white garden are not necessarily pure white; they may have hints of other colors, such as gray, blue, pink, yellow, or green. The White Garden at Sissinghurst, for example, contains white, grey and silver.

Flowers used in white gardens may include:

- White camellia
- Shasta daisy
- White lilac
- Madonna lily
- White periwinkle
- White rose

== Role of symbolism ==
The color white, and white flowers in particular, carry a vast amount of symbolism.

In parts of the US in 1915, single-color flower gardens featuring yellow flowers were used as a symbol of support for women's right to vote.

== See also ==
- List of garden types
