= School garden =

Garden used for educational purposes

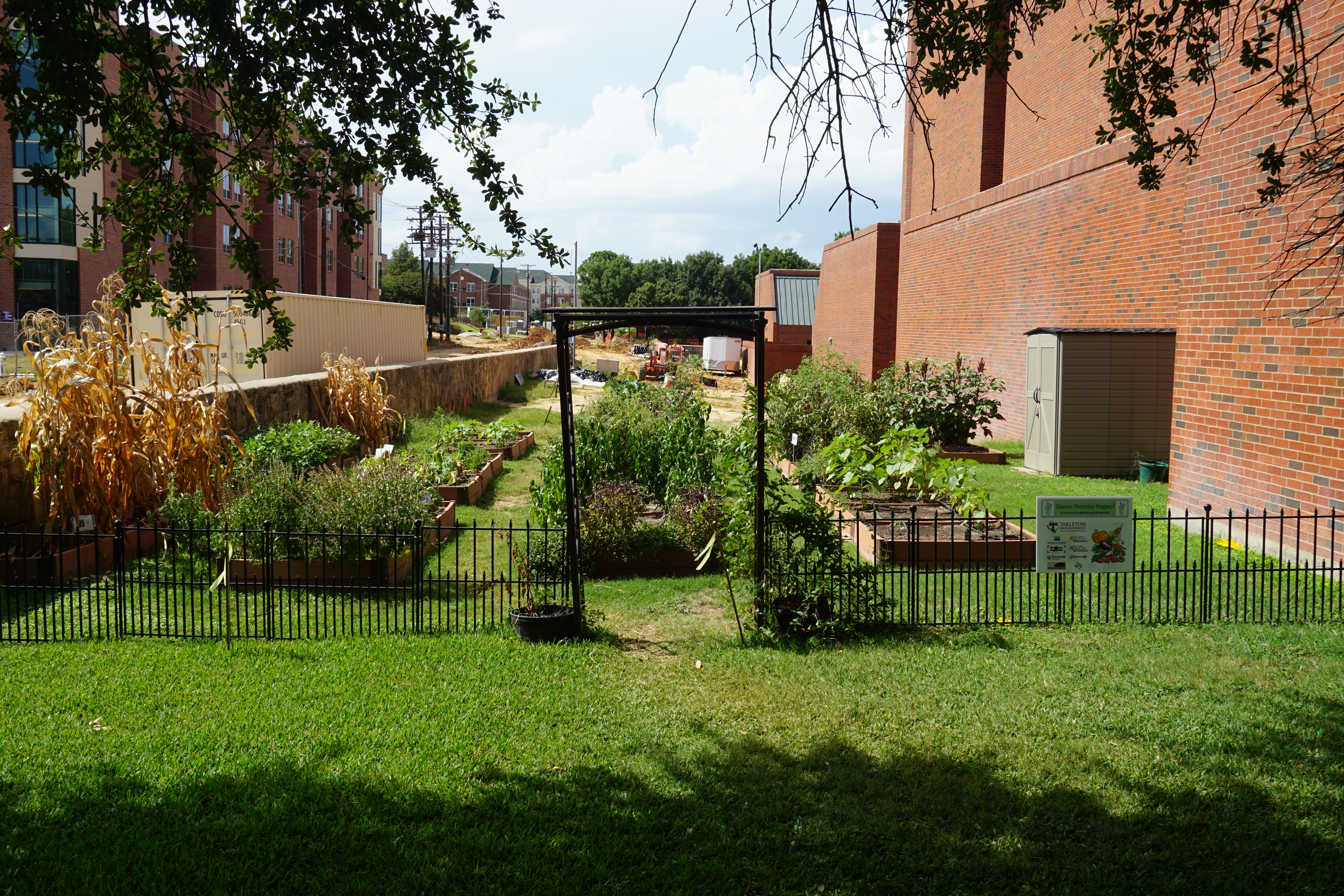
Sustainable Teaching Garden at Tarleton State University

A school garden is an area designated for students to learn how to grow plants and produce at their schools. They are commonly established to improve students' health, social development, and academic achievement.

== History ==
The value of school gardens in education has long been recognized in Europe. They were started as early as 1819 in Schleswig-Holstein. In 1869, they were prescribed by law in Austria and Sweden, in Belgium since 1873 and in France since 1880. In the early 20th century, there were 20,000 schools in Austria with gardens, 45,000 in France, 8,000 in Russia, and 2,500 in Sweden. There used to be 5,000 school gardens in Sweden, but since the introduction of manual training the total has halved. School gardening was practically obligatory for the children of the common schools of Belgium, the Netherlands, British West Indies, and Ceylon. Many governments subsidized the school gardens, offered prizes, and made training in agriculture obligatory for normal school graduates.

Some universities in the United States, including Cornell, the University of Illinois, Ohio State University, and Louisiana State University, have taken up the subject of school agriculture, country life, and scientific farming in earnest. Pamphlets are published by experts in agriculture dealing with important phases of school agriculture and school gardens, in particular Jewell's Agricultural Education (Bulletin 368, U. S. Bureau of Education).

== Curriculum role ==
The school garden has an important relation to several curriculum areas. The first of these is nature study. School gardens allow children a multitude of experiences, such as getting outside, preparing soil, planting seeds, and observing and cultivating plants through the season. Participation in the cycle of growth allows for students to have a hands on experience with plant study.

Secondly, the garden has an important place in the study of geography. In home geography in the early grades children are required to visit the gardens and study the processes of cultivation and marketing the products. In this way, the principles of gardening lead to learning about agriculture, scientific farming, and fruit raising. Children can be taught about the principles involved in farming, the raising of corn and other grains, the feeding of cattle, dairying and butter-making, fruit-culture, as of berries, stone-fruits, apples, and pears. Scientific agriculture and fruit raising are based on principles of careful selection of seeds and of wise cultivation, of fertilizing and preserving soils, of grafting, pruning and caring for fruit trees, and dealing with insect pests.

The school garden has an important relation to esthetics and design. Floriculture, landscape gardening, tree planting and fruit-culture appeal to the sense of beauty. The yard and garden together need to be planted and laid out on principles of taste and attractiveness.

Many progressive normal schools in all parts of the world are taking up the initiative of school gardens, both for the teachers and for the children.

School gardens can also be linked to the curriculum in any grade through science, social studies, math, arts, language arts and more. It has been seen to create a sense of community and is an example of location based learning. Having students garden is experiential learning which can involve the larger community through involving parents, community partners, and elders from the community. It creates an opportunity for intergenerational learning, where people of different ages can come together to grow food and work towards a sustainable environment and community.

Through school gardens, students learn to work the land and create a garden in which they can grow food such as lettuce, potatoes, kale, and peas. Students learn about local food and what grows in their environment. It helps to create a connection to food and get students thinking about where their food comes from and what it takes to grow it. It supports better nutrition in students and can incorporate lessons on healthy eating. This real-world, hands-on learning has proven to be very popular with students and schools. With this, the schoolyard can be an extension of the classroom. It connects students to the natural world and helps create responsible caretakers of the planet. School gardens ultimately contribute to connections between students, teachers, community, food, nature, and sustainability.

=== STEM education ===
School gardens can extend far beyond the growing of vegetables and produce to incorporate more complex ecological STEM systems. By adding rainwater collection systems, photovoltaic panels, composting systems, methane digesters, tiny houses, and other circular systems, a school garden can begin to function as a robust educational land lab. Food, energy, shelter, sanitation, and water can all be provisioned in a school garden that has the right circular systems in operation.

A school garden can be a powerful STEM instructional component within a larger educational land lab. Ecology, biology, agriculture, energy systems, culinary arts, climate science, soil science, and animal husbandry can all function as cross-curricular topics within a school garden land lab.

== Effects ==
Some studies suggest that school gardening programs benefit children's dietary behavior. The experiential nature of cultivating school gardens has allowed it to be effective in increasing their preference and consumption of fruits and vegetables. Hence, they are possible initiatives to combat modern health problems, such as food insecurity and childhood obesity. However, more quantitative research is needed to prove school gardens' beneficial effects on children's health and well-being.

== See also ==
- List of garden types
