= Roman gardens =

Places in ancient Roman civilization

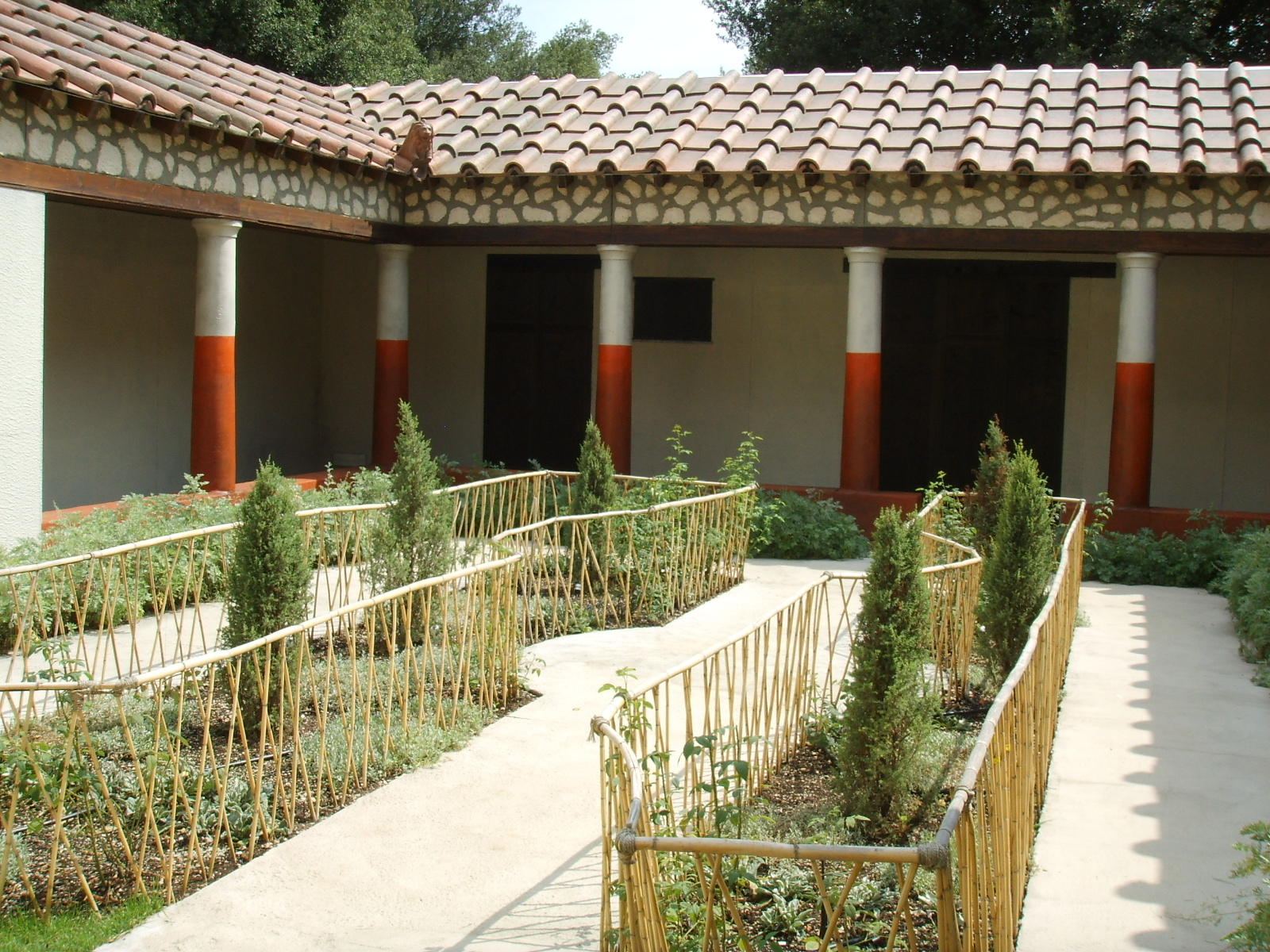
Reconstruction of the garden of the House of the Painters in Pompeii

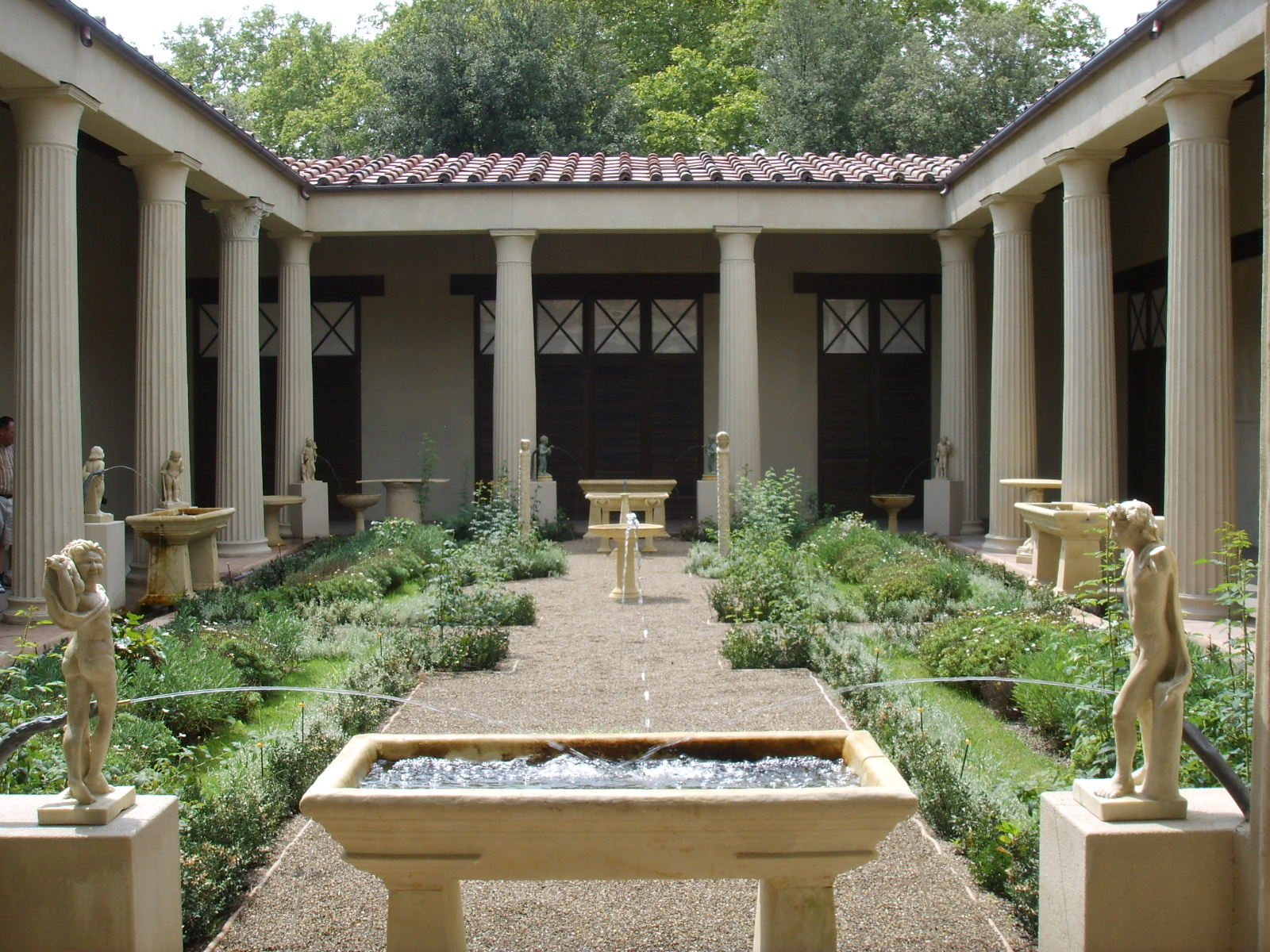
Reconstruction of the garden of the House of the Vettii in Pompeii

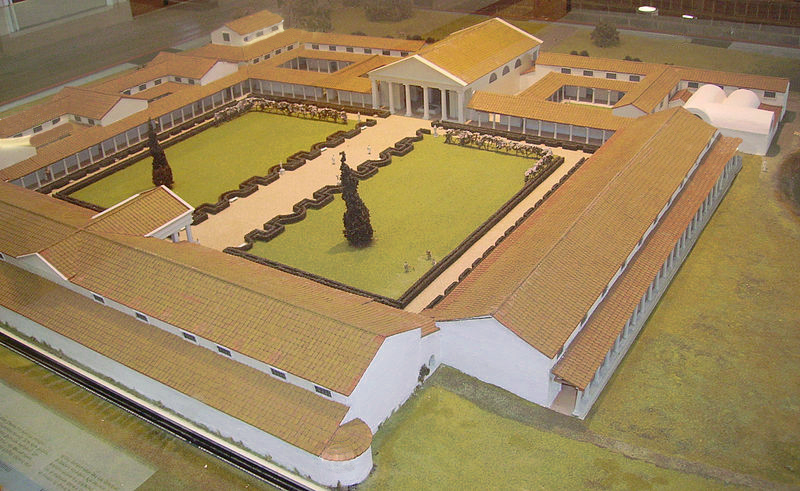
Museum model of Fishbourne Roman Palace with the gardens enclosed by buildings. Archaeologists have been able to recreate the layout and analyse the plants used in the garden.

Roman gardens and ornamental horticulture became highly developed under Roman civilization, and thrived from 150 BC to 350 AD. The Gardens of Lucullus (Horti Lucullani), on the Pincian Hill in Rome, introduced the Persian garden to Europe around 60 BC. It was seen as a place of peace and tranquillity, a refuge from urban life, and a place filled with religious and symbolic meaning. As Roman culture developed and became increasingly influenced by foreign civilizations, the use of gardens expanded.

The Roman garden's history, function, and style is investigated through archaeological and archaeobotanical research, famously conducted at Pompeii, literary sources, and wall paintings and mosaics in homes.

== Influences ==
Roman gardening was influenced by Egyptian and Persian gardening techniques, through acquaintance with Greek gardening. The gardens of Ancient Persia were organized around rills, known from Pasargadae and other sites. Although archaeological evidence of rills have yet to be found in classical Greek gardens, scholars believe that the Romans learned this technique from the Greeks.

Persian gardens developed in response to the arid climate. Gardens were enclosed to gather winter warmth, protect them from drying winds, and differentiate them from the barren and glaring Persian terrain. The soil was cultivated to became rich and fertile. When Alexander the Great conquered parts of Western Asia, he brought back with him new varieties of fruits and plants that prompted a renewed interest in horticulture. Formal gardens had existed in Egypt as early as 2800 BC. At the time of the 18th dynasty of Egypt, gardening techniques, used to beautify the homes of the wealthy, were fully developed. Porticos (porches) served to connect the home with the outdoors, creating outdoor living spaces. Even before Alexander, Cimon of Athens is said to have torn down the walls of his garden to transform it into a public space.

Roman pleasure gardens were adapted from the Grecian model, where such a garden also served the purpose of growing fruit, but while Greeks had "sacred grove" style gardens, they did not have much in the way of domestic gardens to influence the peristyle gardens of Roman homes. Open peristyle courts were designed to connect homes to the outdoors. Athens did not adopt the Roman style that was used to beautify temple groves and create recreational spaces in the less traditional Grecian cities of Sparta, Corinth and Patras, which adopted the Western peristyle domestic gardens.

== Uses ==
Roman gardens were built to suit a range of activities. Initially, lower class Romans used kitchen gardens as a source of food to provide for their families and mainly grew herbs and vegetables. In Ancient Latium, a garden was a part of every farm. According to Cato the Elder, in his text De agri cultura every garden should be close to the house and should have flower beds and ornamental trees.

Later, the different influences of Egyptian, Persian, and Greek gardens became a part of Roman horticulture, producing villa and palatial pleasure gardens, along with public parks and gardens meant for enjoyment or to exercise in. No type of garden was specifically reserved for wealthy Romans; all a civilian needed was to have their own land or home. Excavations in Pompeii show that gardens attached to residences were scaled down to meet the space constraints of the home of the average Roman.

Horace wrote that during his time, flower gardens became a national indulgence. Augustus constructed the Porticus Liviae, a public garden on the Oppian Hill in Rome. Outside Rome, gardens tended to proliferate at centers of wealth. Modified versions of Roman garden designs were adopted in Roman settlements in Africa, Gaul and Britannia.

== Places for a garden ==
Gardens were usually built in one of six structures:

=== Domus (townhouse) ===
This free-standing structure was usually one story, containing multiple rooms for everyday activities and an atrium toward the front of the house to collect rainwater and illuminate the area surrounding it. Toward the back of the house was often a hortus (garden) or peristylium (an open courtyard). These gardens are common in urban dwellings, such as those within the walls of Pompeii.

=== Roman villa ===
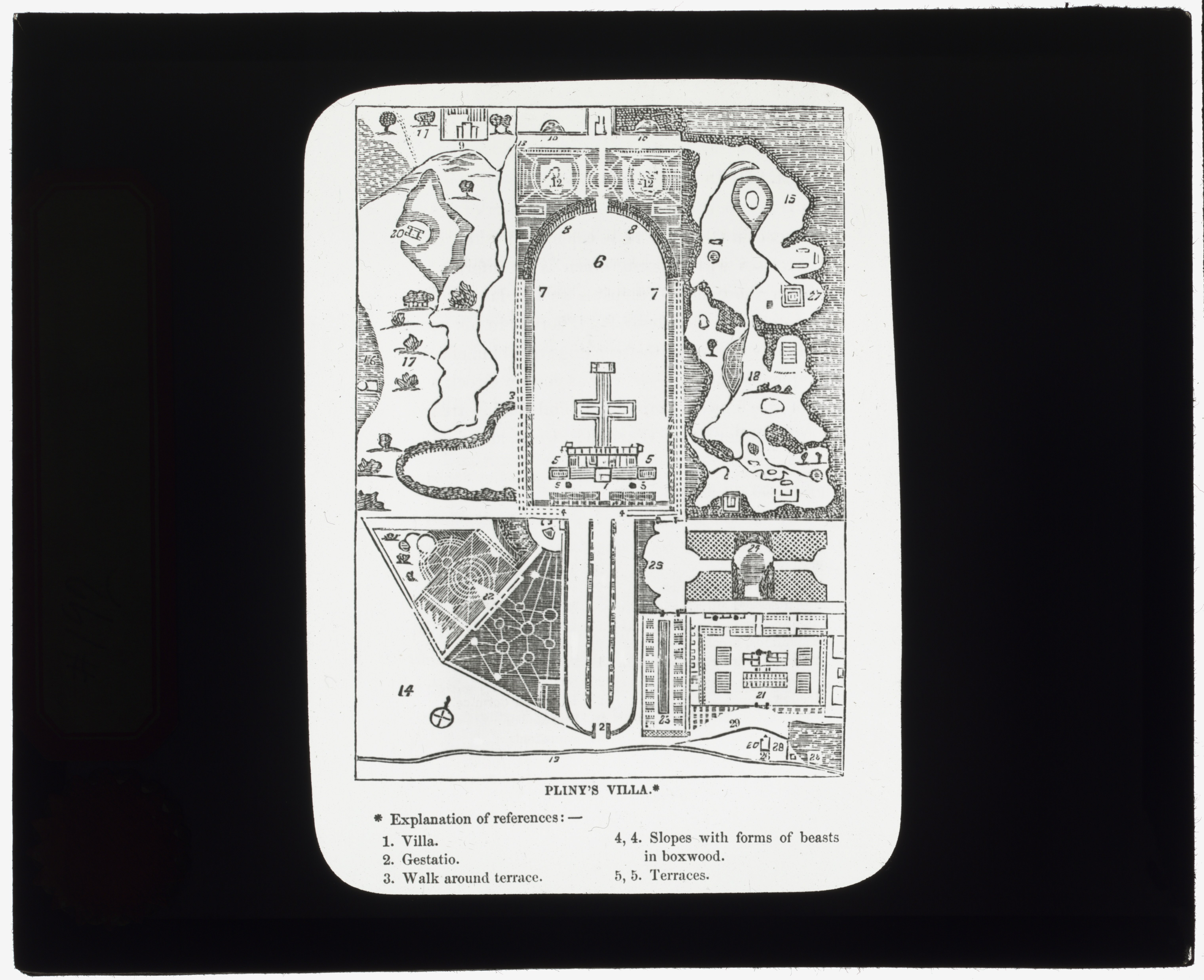
A reproduction of the plan Villa at Laurentum, as described in the letters of Pliny the Younger.

The Roman villa was typically a country house for wealthy people, that was accessible from the city, and served as a retreat from urban living. Villas and their gardens are categorized by location: maritime, suburban, and country villas being the most common kinds. A notable example is the maritime villa at Laurentum, which Pliny the Younger describes at length in his letters. Villa gardens were lavishly decorated, and could include private spaces for exercise, known as gymnasiums, and larger open areas for hunting game.

=== Villa rustica ===
A villa rustica was a villa set in the countryside, often the hub of a large agricultural estate. Gardens at these sites were planted at a large scale, and often are found with processing equipment, suggesting that the Villas were producing goods for profit. These gardens could be technologically complex, incorporating irrigation, grafts, and cross pollination. Notable examples include Villa Boscoreale in Herculaneum, where extensive pollen analysis has been conducted to identify the flora cultivated.

=== Imperial gardens ===
Reserved for imperial families alone, very large and extravagant. Imperial gardens could be constructed in various places. Palace gardens, in cities were transformed as power shifted from one ruling family to another, while imperial villa gardens were largely the same as a typical country villa, though more elaborate.

=== Non-residential gardens ===
A non-residential garden refers to a garden either planted and maintained for public use, or one dedicated to the people after the death of the owner. These consisted of temple gardens, sacred groves–collections of trees established in honor of a specific deity, parks, etc. Non-residential gardens were constructed and dedicated to the people by the elite, and attached to other buildings or monuments constructed for public use, such as theaters or baths, in a practice commonly referred to as euergetism. Additionally, commercial gardens, that typically specialized in growing produce or flowers, also fall into this category.

== Design ==
Roman gardens are typically divided into two categories: the enclosed garden and the open garden. However, all Roman gardens were generally made up of the same basic elements. Depending on the formality, function, or type of garden, elements may be added or embellished more, or may be omitted altogether.

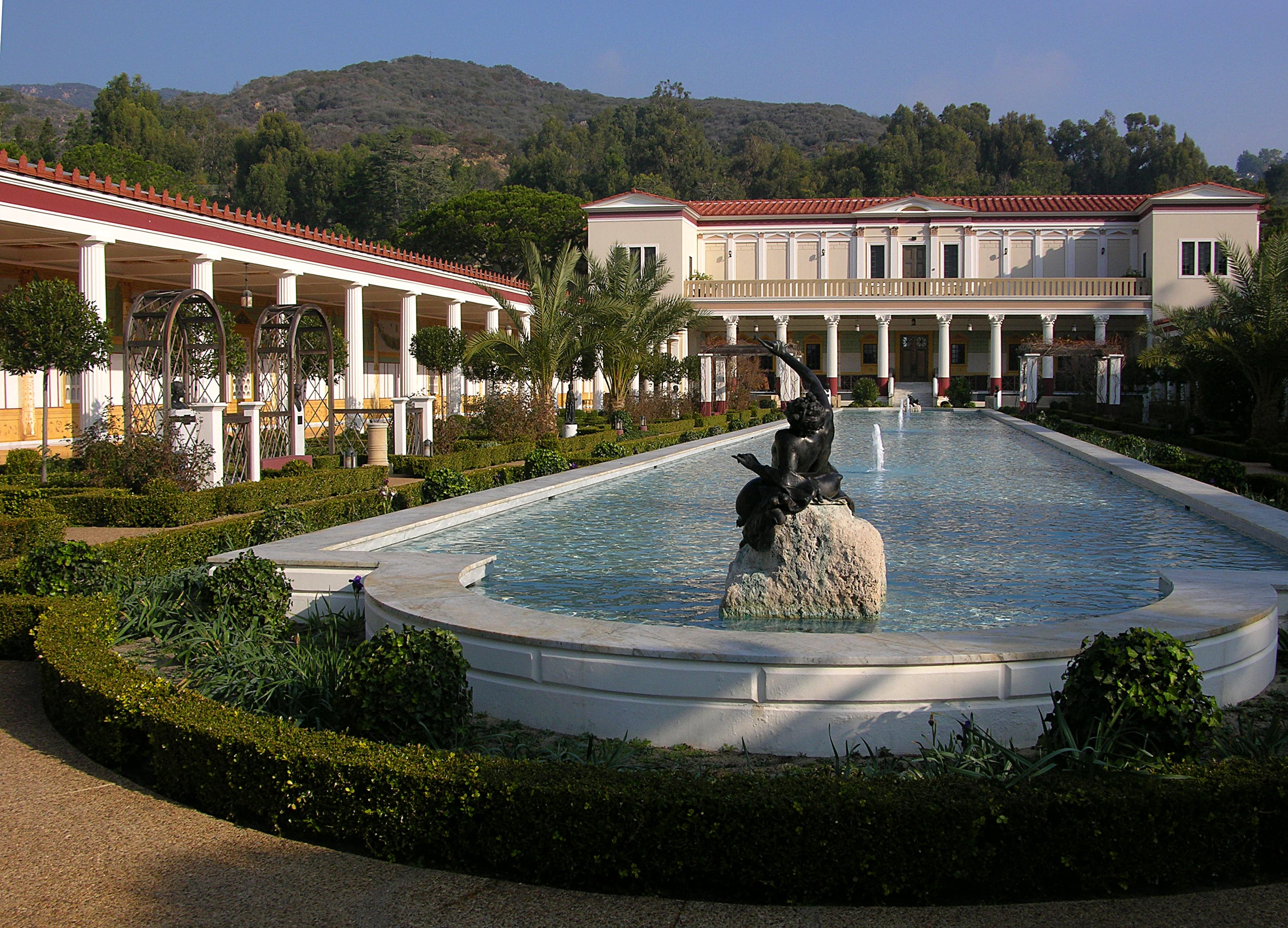
The Getty Villa, a recreation of the Villa de Papyri located in Malibu, features many common elements of an upscale garden, such as water features, pergolas, and a peristyle.

Pleasure gardens would incorporate different designs according to the taste of their builders. All gardens of this type have the same basic parts to them: a patio at the entrance, a terrace, an orchard or vineyard, several water features, a kitchen garden, pergolas, shrines, nymphaea, and other garden features that would personalize the garden, such as statues. The patio would normally be decorated with outside garden furniture, a water basin or fountain, and be the starting point of a walk that would show off all the features of the garden.

Peristyle – from a Greek word, where "peri" means "around" and "style" means "column" – denotes a type of open courtyard, which is surrounded by walls of columns supporting a portico (porch).

Terrace gardens were constructed when a hilly landscape made it difficult to enjoy a typical garden layout. These gardens consisted of stepped levels, often designed to contrast the other levels.

The xystus (garden walk or terrace) was a core element of Roman gardens. The xystus often overlooked a lower garden, or ambulation. The ambulation bordered a variety of flowers, trees, and other foliage, and it served as an ideal place for a leisurely stroll after a meal, conversation, or other recreational activities.

The gestation was a shaded avenue where the master of the house could ride horseback or be carried by his slaves. It generally encircled the ambulation or was constructed as a separate oval-shaped space. Paths or walkways were often constructed through the garden. These were made with loose stone, gravel, sand, or packed earth. Gardens featured many ornamental objects, from sculpture to frescoes to sundials. These depicted nature scenes or were put in place as a shrine (aedicula) to the gods or otherworldly creatures.

Even though an atrium is found inside the house, it is considered part of the garden because it has an opening that would allow Romans to collect rain water, known as an impluvium.

The garden walls had both aesthetic and practical value. Walls were decorated with statues, paintings, and design elements to enhance the theming of the garden. More practical gardens, such as the shop garden at Pompeii excavated by Wilhelmina Jashemski, contained fragments of pottery embedded into the perimeter walls, to prevent vandalism and theft.

== Plants ==
=== Overview ===
The plants that were grown ranged from flowering plants to herbs and vegetables for everyday culinary and medicinal use, as well as trees. Types of plants in Roman gardens can be determined from historical sources, wall frescoes depicting garden scenes, as well as pollen and root cavity analysis. Romans cultivated both local and imported plant species. The most popular plants found in a typical Roman family's garden were pine trees, roses, cypress, rosemary, and mulberry trees. Also possibly included were a variety of dwarf trees, often pruned for ornamental purposes, tall trees, marigolds, hyacinths, narcissi, violets, saffron, cassia, and thyme. The types of plants in a specific garden often depended on the purpose, location, and scale of the garden, but were commonly planted in size order, with the smaller plants at towards the front of the bed, and the larger at the back.

=== Flowering plants ===
A variety of flowers would have been found in a Roman garden. Rose, violet, geranium, and buttercup pollen samples have been uncovered at garden sites, and lilies, irises, daisies, and other common flowers feature prominently in garden frescoes. Large scale, commercial flower gardens have also been excavated, such as the Garden of Hercules at Pompeii. Flowers and other plants such as parsley were cultivated for aesthetic purposes, as well as to be used in perfume or ceremonial garlands.

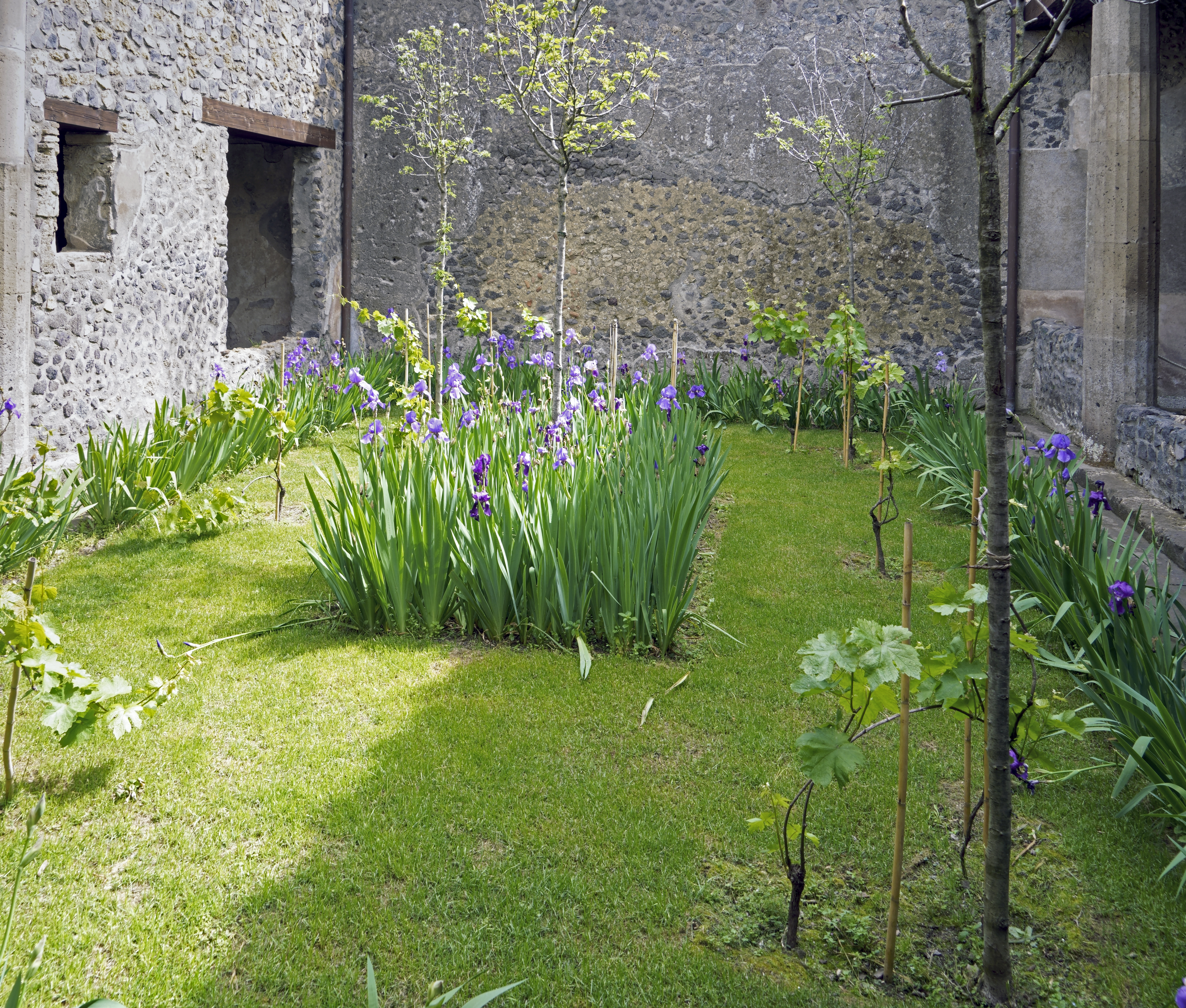
A small garden in Casa della Nave Europa, in Pompeii. This garden reconstruction highlights the interplanting of trees, florals, and other vegetation.

=== Trees ===
Trees were used to provide shade, structural support for vining plants, as well as harvested for fruit. More elaborate gardens could also include more formally planned orchards, while more simple gardens would intersperse trees amongst the other plants. Common tree varieties in Roman gardens included olive, chestnut, cypress, pine, almond, and mulberry trees, as well as imported citrus trees. Pliny the Elder writes, in the Natural History, that certain trees were planted in honor of various gods.

=== Herbs and spices ===
Herbs were a common feature of a Roman kitchen garden, cultivated for culinary and medicinal purposes. Species such as garlic, basil, coriander, dill, parsley, rosemary, onion, and mustard were grown across the Empire, as far as Britain.

=== Vining plants ===
Vining plants were often planted in terracotta pots and trained to grow up garden structures for decoration and shade. Grapes were frequently interspersed throughout the garden. A villa rustica, for example, might additionally contain equipment for processing grapes into wine. Additional vining plants found in gardens include bean varieties, as well as vining flowers. Additionally, ivy, native to the area, has been found in gardens.

== Legacy ==
The common practices and elements of Roman gardens spread alongside the Roman Empire itself, simultaneously influencing and being influenced by the conquered territories. The garden design was typically altered to match the climate of its new setting. Much of the influence of the Roman garden on later eras passes through the gardening practices of the Byzantine Empire. This preserved version of Roman garden designs led to the Italian garden, elements of which were adopted by Renaissance, Baroque, Neoclassical, and even 20th century landscape architects. Further, gardening implements and technologies in Italy are very similar: modern Italian gardens feature interplanting of various species, and the use of terracotta pots.

== See also ==
- Gardens of ancient Egypt
- Giardino all'italiana
- Agriculture in ancient Rome
