= Gardens of ancient Egypt =

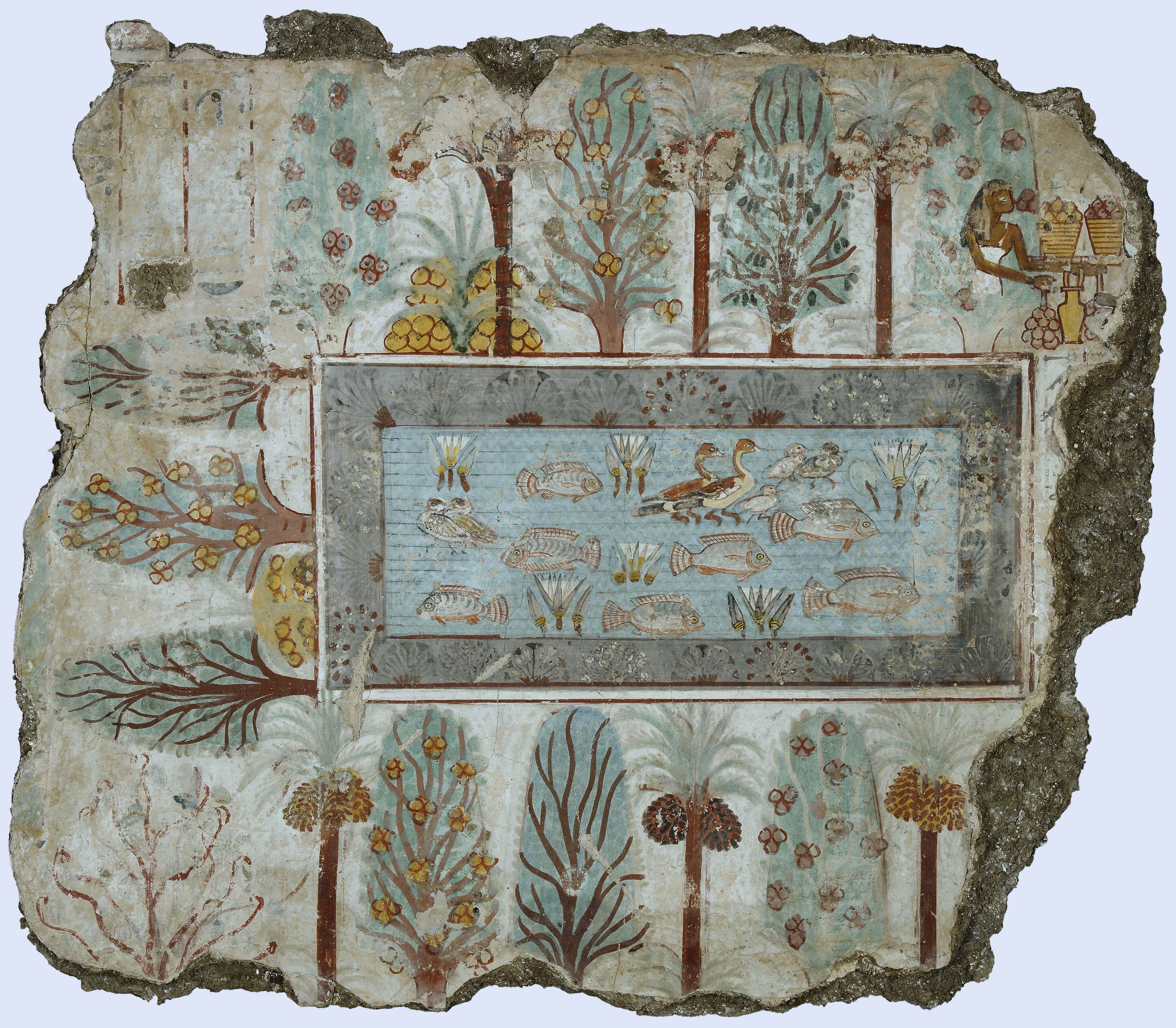
Rectangular fishpond with ducks and lotus planted round with date palms and fruit trees, in a fresco from the Tomb of Nebamun, Thebes, 18th Dynasty

The gardens of ancient Egypt probably began as simple fruit orchards and vegetable gardens, irrigated with water from the Nile. Gradually as the country became richer, they evolved into pleasure gardens with flowers, ponds and valleys of fruit and shade trees. Garden structure became a key part in the creation of Egyptian gardens. The presentation and order of the garden reflected the wealth and respect of the ones who had past. Temples, palaces, and private residences had their own gardens, and models of gardens were sometimes placed in tombs so their owners could enjoy them in their afterlife.

== History ==
The history and character of gardens in ancient Egypt, like all aspects of Egyptian life, depended upon the Nile, and the network of canals that drew water from it. Water was hoisted from the Nile in leather buckets and carried on the shoulders to the gardens, and later, beginning in about the 14th century BCE, lifted from wells by hoists with counterbalancing weights called shadouf in Arabic. The earliest gardens were composed of planting beds divided into squares by earthen walls, so the water could soak into the soil rather than be lost.

Egyptian gardens were a symbol of the after-life and Egyptians' dedication to religion. These gardens acted as a resting place for gods, while enforcing peace and honor.

Gardens belonged to temples or the residences. Secular gardens were located near the river or canals and were used mainly for growing vegetables. Beginning during the New Kingdom, gardens were attached to more luxurious residences and were sometimes enclosed by walls. Temple gardens were used to raise certain vegetables for ceremonies.

== Garden Structure ==
When designing gardens, ancient Egyptian architects emphasized the importance of geometry and symmetry through the use of straight lines and rectangles. Additionally, this layout of gardens was intentional for the incorporation of water and irrigation. Pools acted as a location where offerings and rituals could be shared. Pools were a symbol of refreshment. For example, T-shaped pools were used to make offerings and its rectangular shape emphasized a clean garden structure.

== Palace gardens ==
Palace gardens first appeared in Egypt just before the Middle Kingdom (2040–1782). These gardens were very large in scale, and were laid out in geometric patterns. The ponds of palace gardens were enormous and numerous. In the third millennium BC, the garden pond of King Sneferu was large enough for boats rowed by twenty oarsmen.

The rulers of ancient Egypt, such as Queen Hatshepsut (1503–1482 BC) and Ramses III (1198–1166 BC), used pots to bring back to Egypt new kinds of trees and flowers discovered during their conquests in Libya, Syria, and Cyrenia.

== Pleasure gardens ==
Beginning during the time of the New Kingdom, pleasure gardens became a common feature of luxury residences. According to paintings in tombs in Thebes from the 18th Dynasty (1552–1296 BC), gardens of that time had a standard design. They had a pond, usually rectangular, in the center, filled with colorful fish, with lotus blossoms in the water and flowers around the edges. Around the pond were successive rows of trees, including sycamores, palms, and pomegranates, alternating with flower beds. The edges of the water basins were sloping, with a stairway down one side so gardeners could collect water for irrigation.

The pond was often surrounded by walls or columns supporting grapevines. The walls and columns were decorated with colorful paintings of people, animals, and plants such as the poppy and rose.

== Temple gardens ==
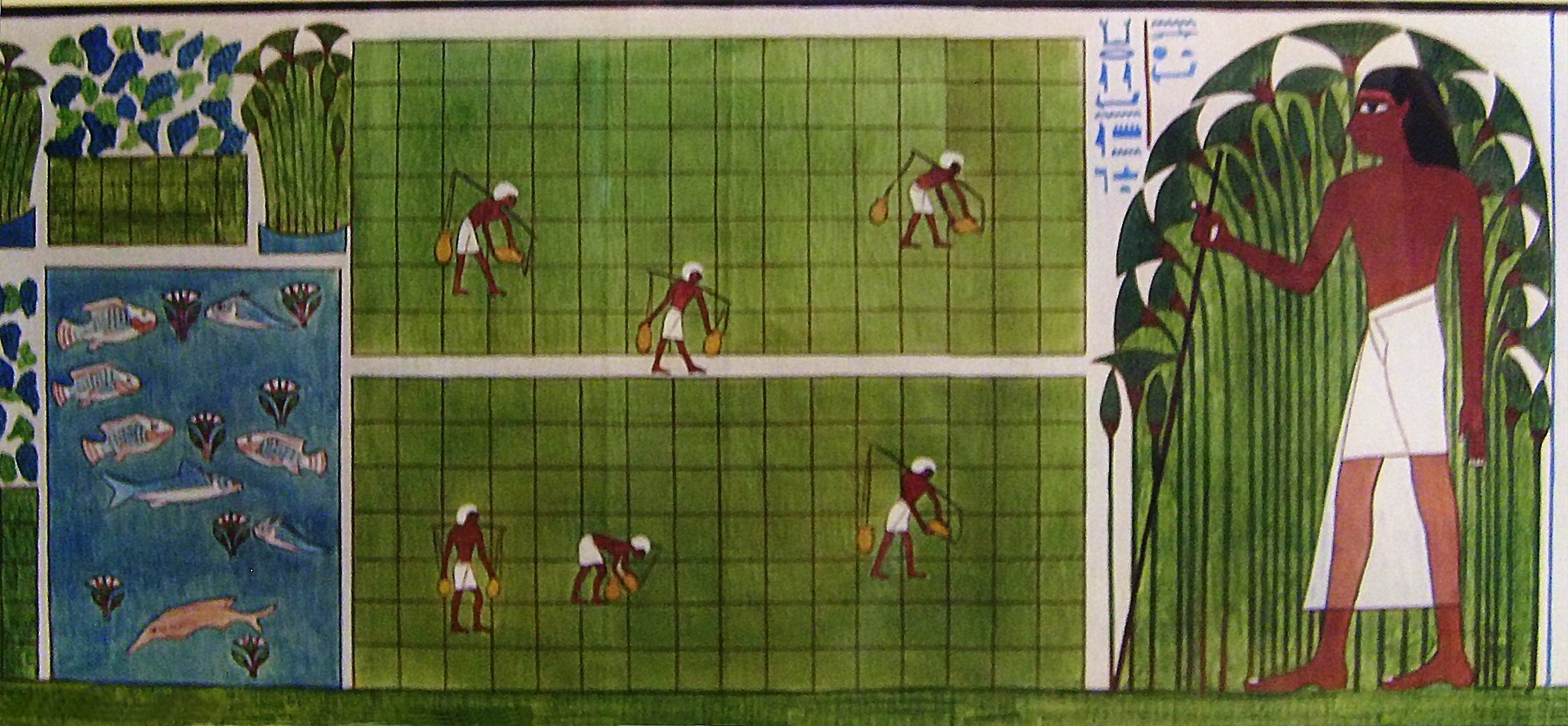
Gardens of Amun from the Temple of Karnak, mural in the tomb of Nakh, the chief gardener, early 14th century BC. (Royal Museum of Art and History, Brussels)

Temples often had extensive gardens. The Temple of Amun at Karnak had twenty-six kitchen gardens, alongside a very early botanical garden, which, according to an inscription, contained "all kinds of beautiful flowers and bizarre plants which are found in the divine land which His Majesty has conquered." The hymns painted on the walls of tombs show that religious ceremonies centered on the cycles of nature and the changing seasons. Temple gardens often had rows of fig trees and sycamores (the tree sacred to the goddess Hathor), tamarisks, willows, or palm trees. Rows of trees sometimes stretched for several kilometers, connecting several temples. The temples themselves had esplanades planted with trees. When rows of trees were planted far from the river, wells had to be dug ten meters deep to reach water for irrigation. During the time of Amenophis III, some temples were devoted to a goddess in the form of a tree, with a trunk for a body and branches for arms. This goddess was believed to carry water to the dead to quench their thirst. Temple gardens often were the homes of animals sacred to the gods, such as the ibis and the baboon. Flowers were part of all the religious ceremonies during the time of the god Amon. These gardens also produced medicinal herbs and spices such as cumin, marjoram, anise, and coriander.

== Funeral gardens ==
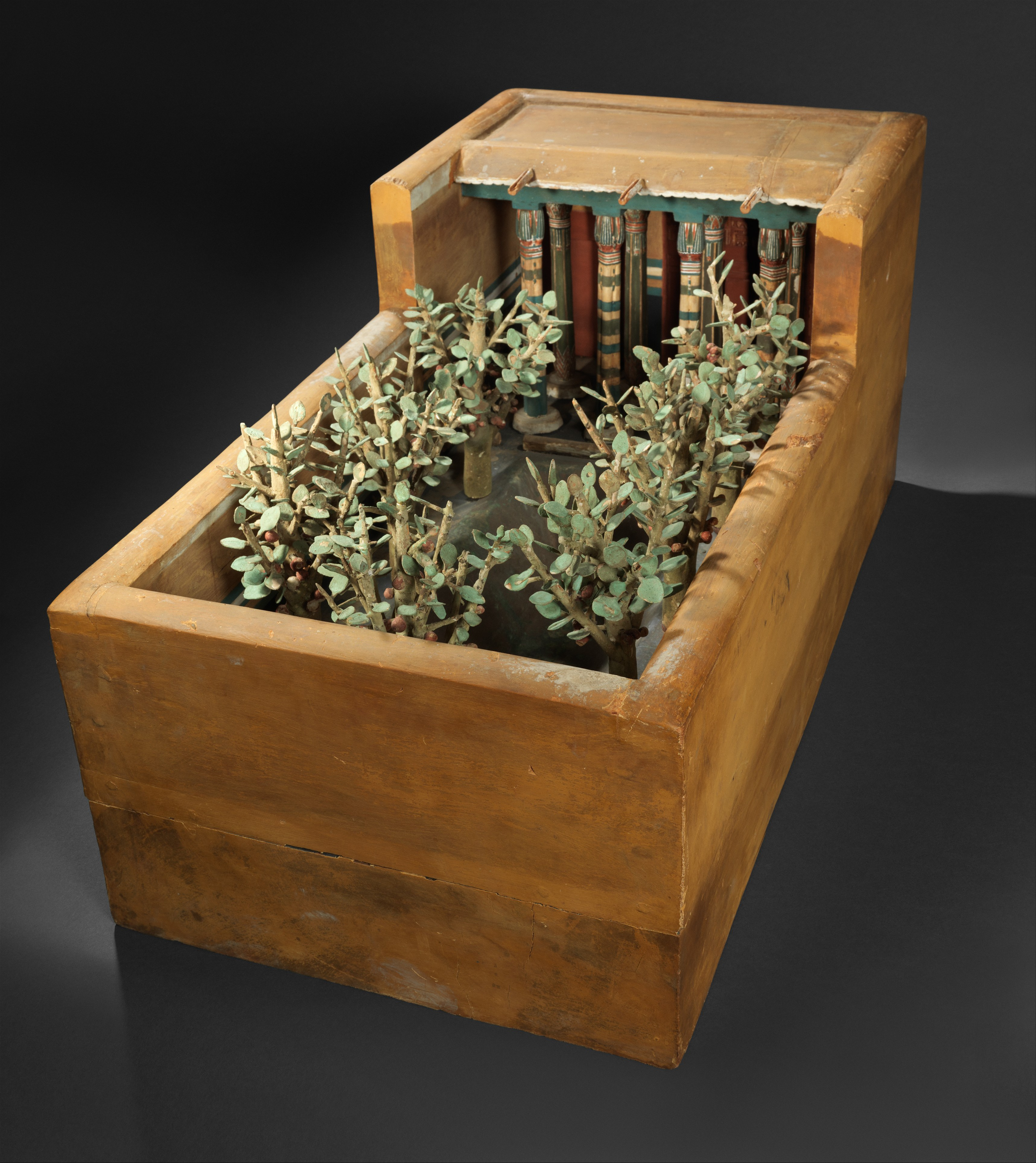
A funerary model of a garden, dating to the Eleventh dynasty of Egypt, circa 2009–1998 BC. Made of painted and gessoed wood, originally from Thebes.

Funeral gardens were miniature versions of house gardens that were placed in tombs. They usually had a small square house or pavilion with wooden columns, surrounded by a wall, Within the wall was a basin surrounded by a row of trees. The house resembled the kiosks in gardens, where the owner would play checkers or relax. The dead were traditionally surrounded by the objects they would have enjoyed in life, and it was expected that they would continue to enjoy their gardens in their afterlife. The inscription of one tomb said: "You promenade at your ease by the lovely bank of your pond; your heart rejoices from your trees and is refreshed under your sycamores; your heart is satisfied by the water from your wells that you made so that they would last forever."

== Trees and plants in the Egyptian garden ==
Trees were used in the gardens to produce fruit and for shade. Nineteen different species of trees were found in the gardens of Ineni, the architect to the Pharaoh Thutmose I (1504–1492 B.C.). The pink flowered tamarisk, acacia and willow trees were common in gardens. The sycamore (Ficus sycomorus) and tamarisk trees were sometimes planted in front of temples, as they were at the temple of Nebhepetra, from the 11th century BC.

The ancient Egyptians cultivated Ficus sycomorus from Predynastic times, and in quantity from the start of the third millennium BCE. It was believed to be the ancient Egyptian Tree of Life, planted on the threshold between life and death. Zohary and Hopf note that "the fruit and the timber, and sometimes even the twigs, are richly represented in the tombs of the Egyptian Early, Middle and Late Kingdoms." Some of the caskets of mummies in Egypt are made from the wood of this tree.

The most common fruit trees were date palms, fig trees and doum palms (Hyphaene thebaica). The persea tree was considered sacred, and was found in both temple gardens and residential gardens. The pomegranate tree was introduced during the New Kingdom, and was prized for its aroma and color. Other fruits grown in the gardens were jujube, olives, and peaches. Vegetables were grown for food or for ceremonies. Cos lettuce was considered sacred and was connected with Min, the deity of reproduction, and was believed to be a powerful aphrodisiac. Grapes were used to make raisins and wine. Tomb paintings show that grape vines were sometimes planted atop pergolas to provide shade to the garden. Flowers were raised in gardens to make decorative bouquets and for use in religious ceremonies. Common garden flowers were the mandrake and the daisy, chrysanthemum, anemone, and poppy, jasmine, and the rose.

Egyptian ponds and basins were often decorated white and blue lotus (Nymphaea caerulea) and with papyrus.

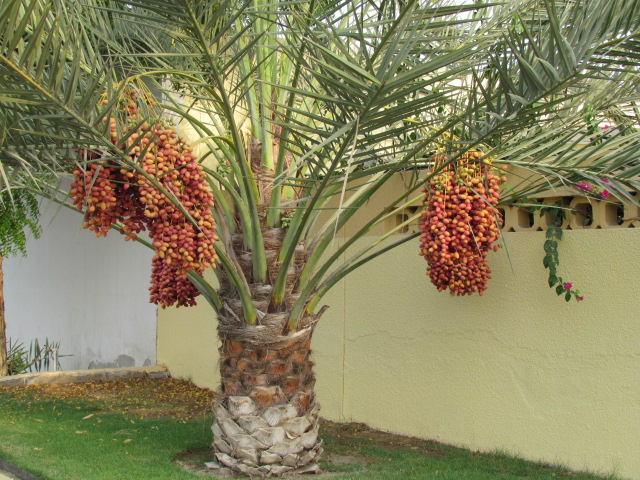
The date palm, used by the Ancient Egyptians both as a food and for making wine. The Egyptians learned to pollinate the trees by hand.

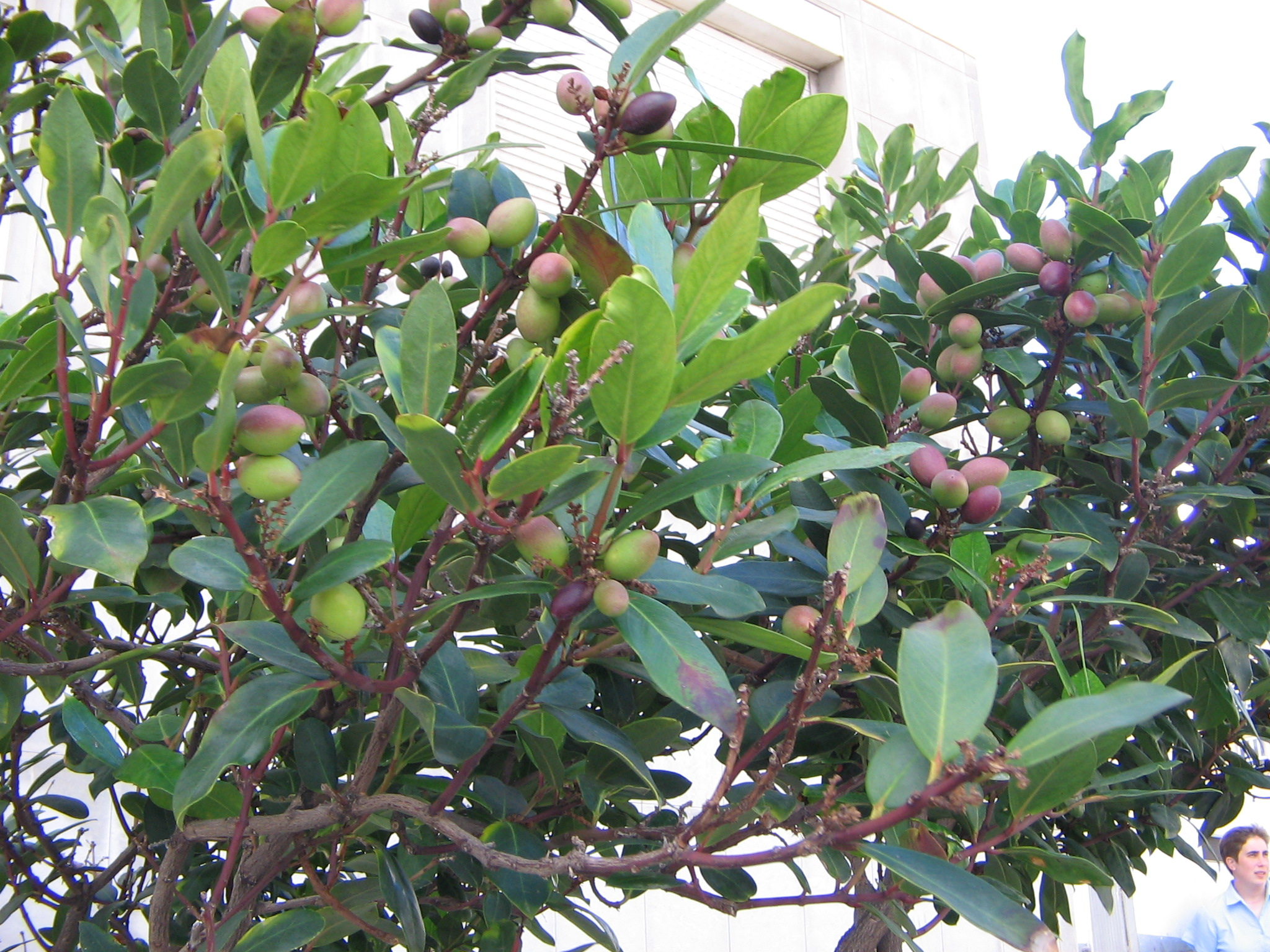
The Persea indica tree, in the same family as the avocado, once common in Egypt, has vanished there but can still be found in the Azores and Canary Islands.

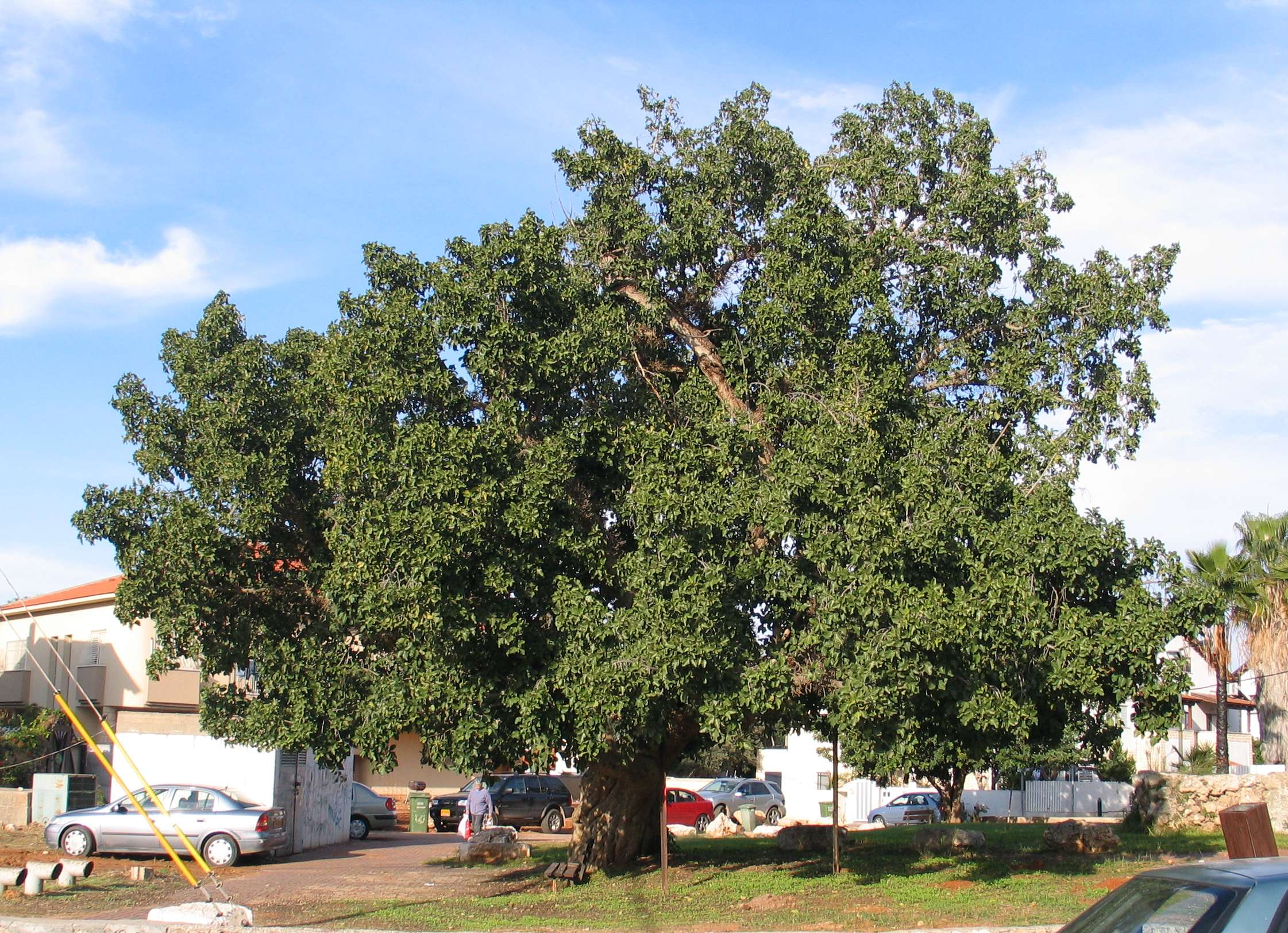
The sycamore (Ficus sycomorus) was often planted for shade. It was also often planted at temples, and its wood was used for making coffins for mummies.

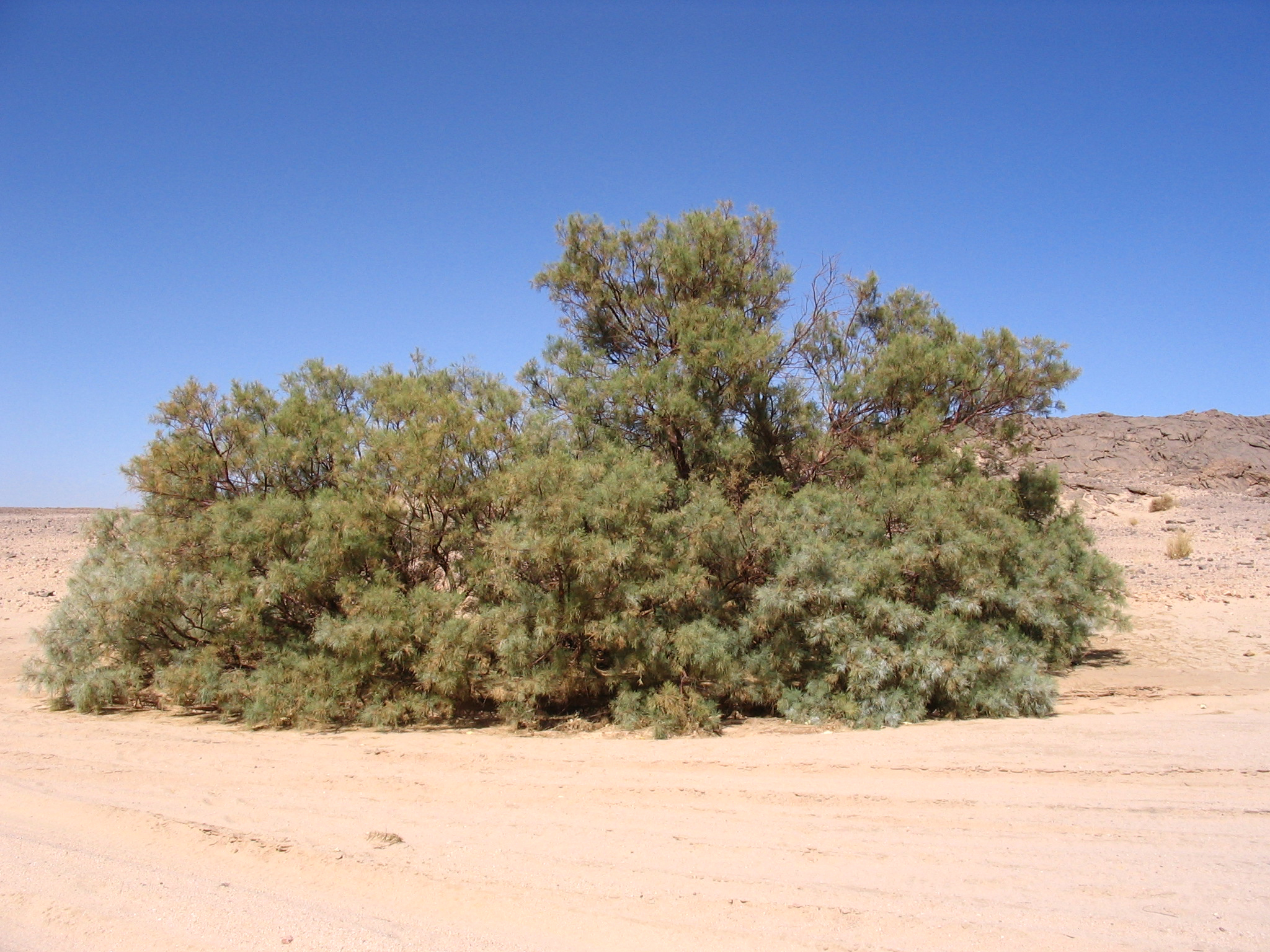
Tamarisk tree, used for shade

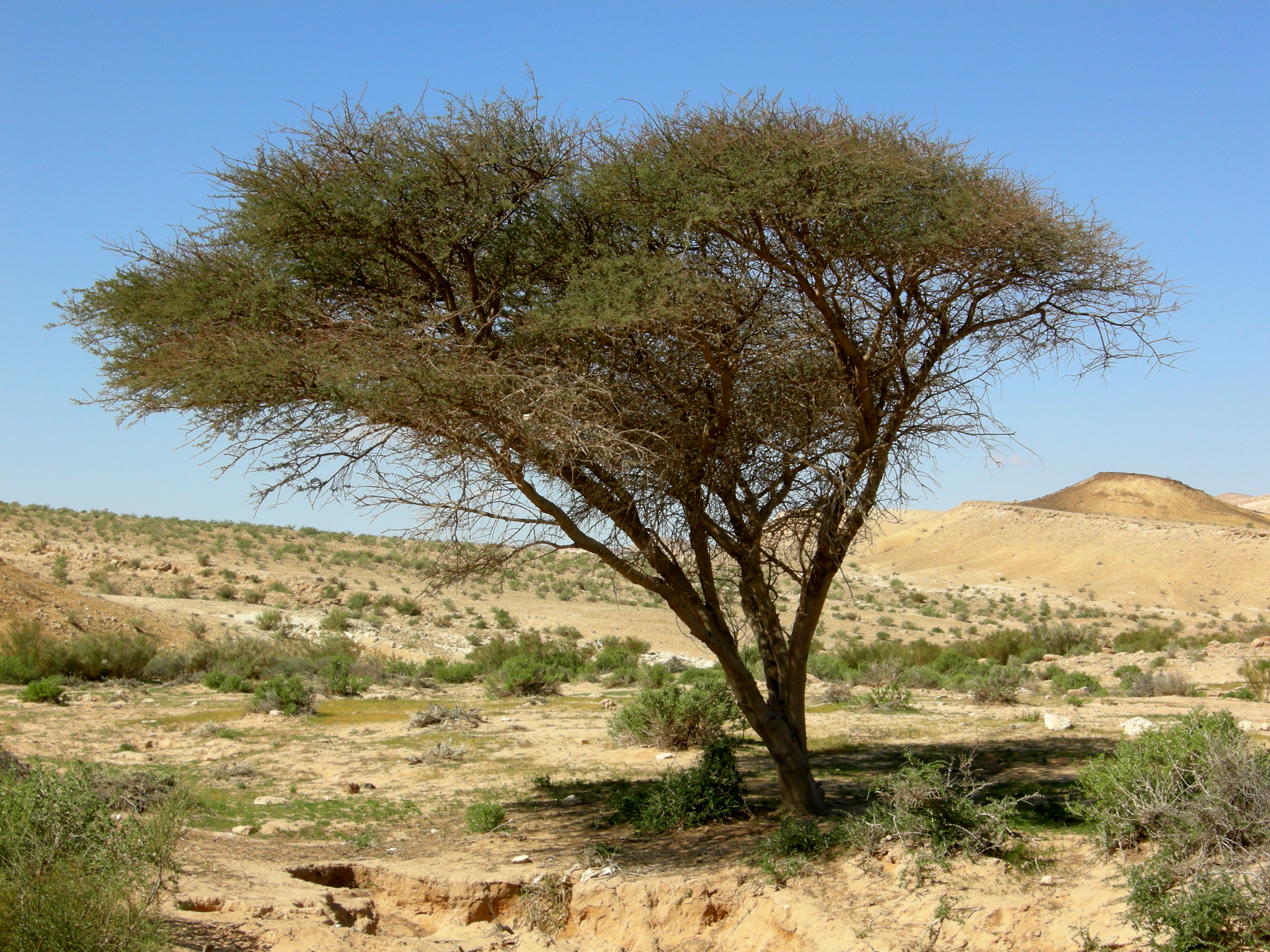
The Acacia tree was associated with Iusaaset, the primal goddess of Egyptian mythology.

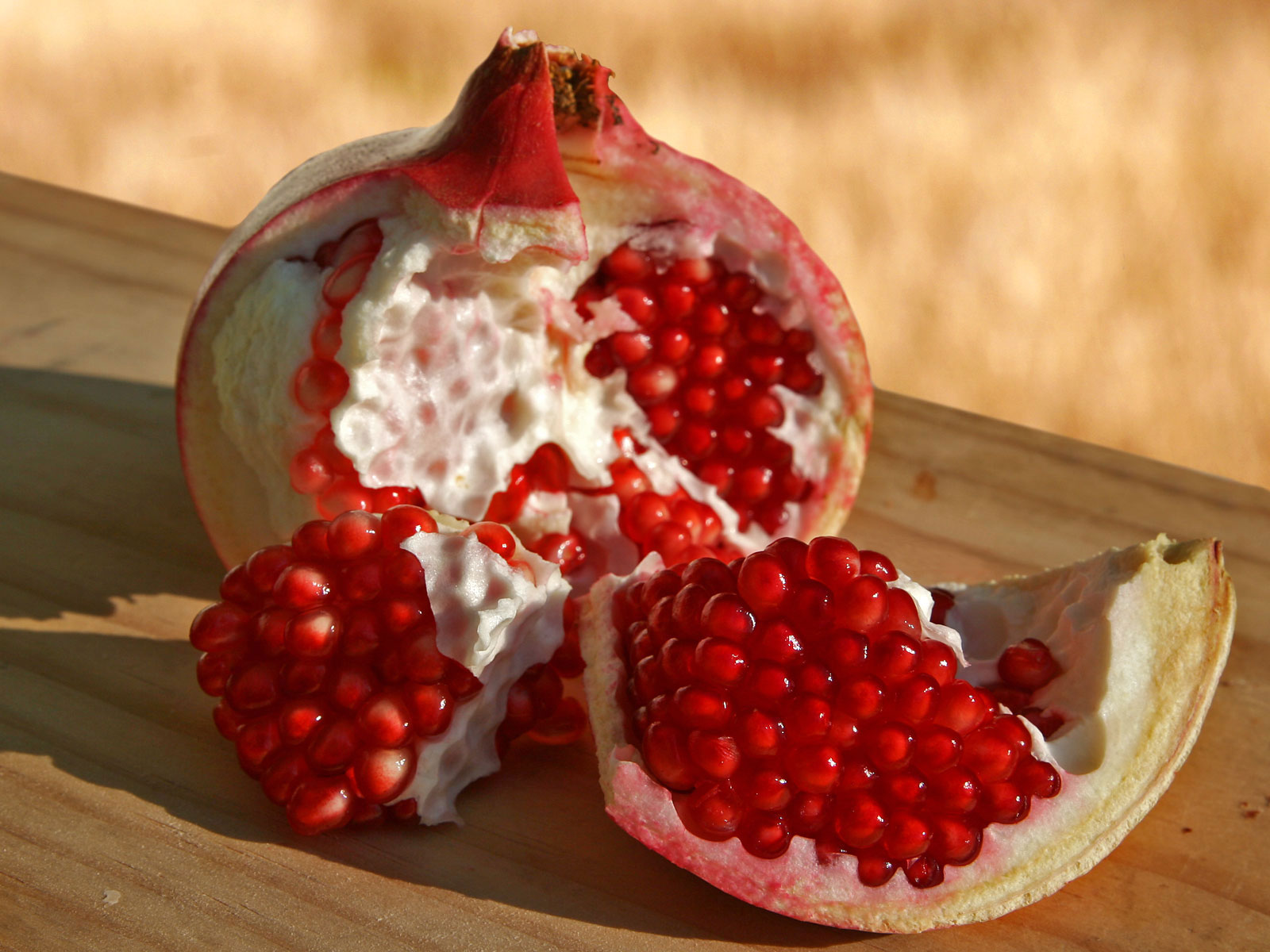
Fruit of the Pomegranate tree, introduced during the New Kingdom, used as a medicine against tapeworm various infections.

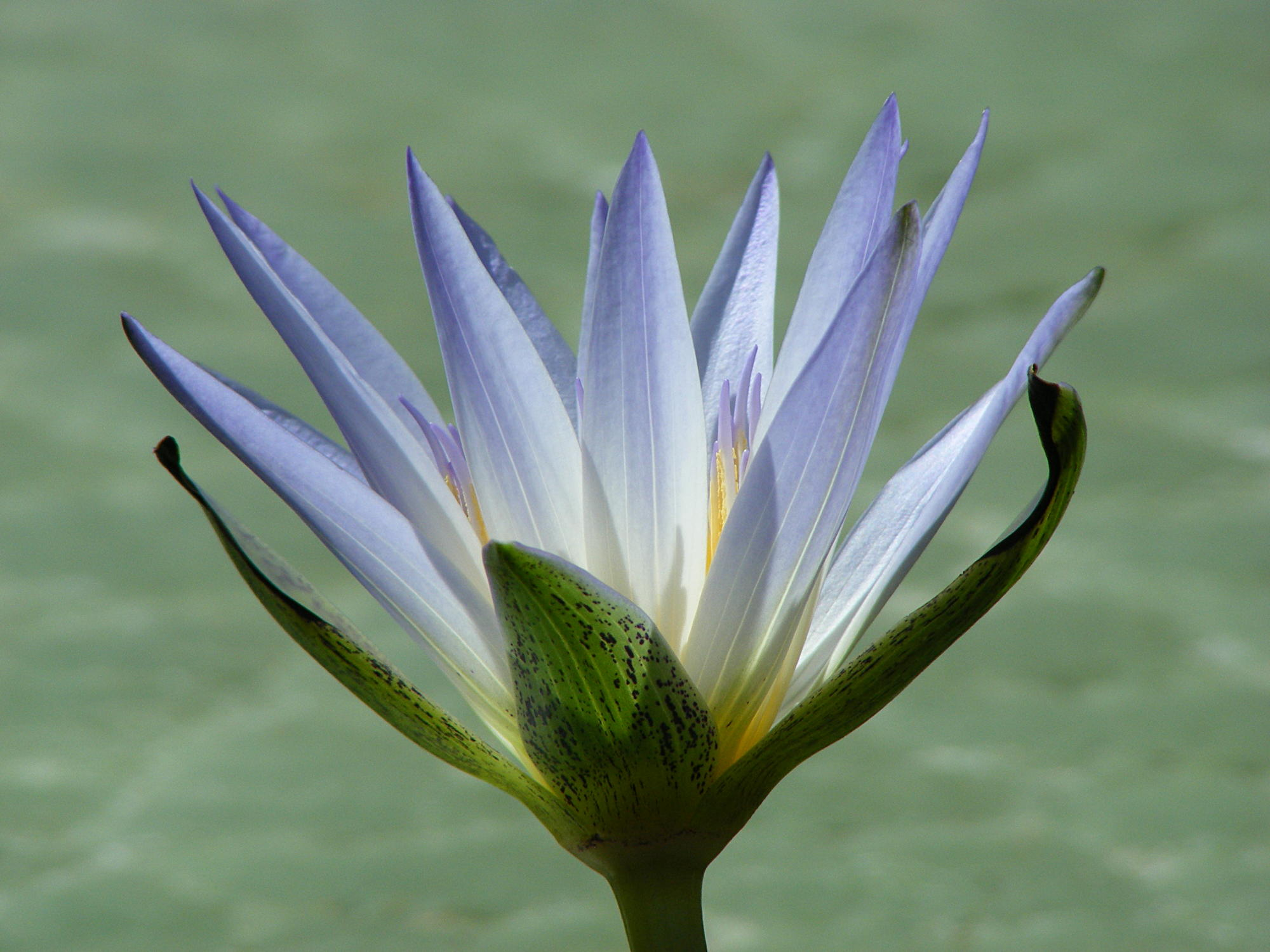
Blue Egyptian lotus, found in garden ponds

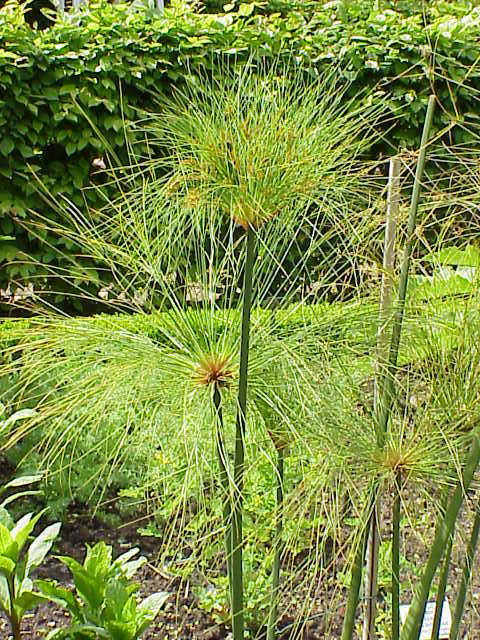
Cyperus papyrus was used as a writing material, for making boats, and even eaten.

== Ponds and pools ==
Water became a very important element in ancient gardens. It provided gardens with even more uses including breeding fish, being an area to cool off, and was used to help grow all the plants. Ponds and pools were a common feature of the residential gardens of the wealthy and powerful of ancient Egypt, and are shown in a number of tomb paintings. Sometimes, as in the garden of Hatshepsut’s mortuary temple at Deir el-Bahri, the pond was in the shape of a T, with one part of the T connected to a river or canal. The water was usually hoisted into the pond from the river by hand, or using a shadouf. Fish for food and ornament were raised in the ponds. They also were the home of migrating water birds.

Flowers such as white and blue lotus were grown in the ponds for decoration and for ceremonies, and papyrus was known to grow at Deir el-Bahri. Later, during the Persian occupation of Egypt, the pink lotus was introduced.

== Shade, color and aroma ==
Shade was an important feature of the garden, provided by trees and by grapevines supported between columns. Describing these gardens, Shaw and Nicholson wrote: "The overall effect would have been one of cool shade, heavy with the fragrance of the flowers and the trees. Gardens are therefore one of the most frequent settings of Egyptian romantic tales."

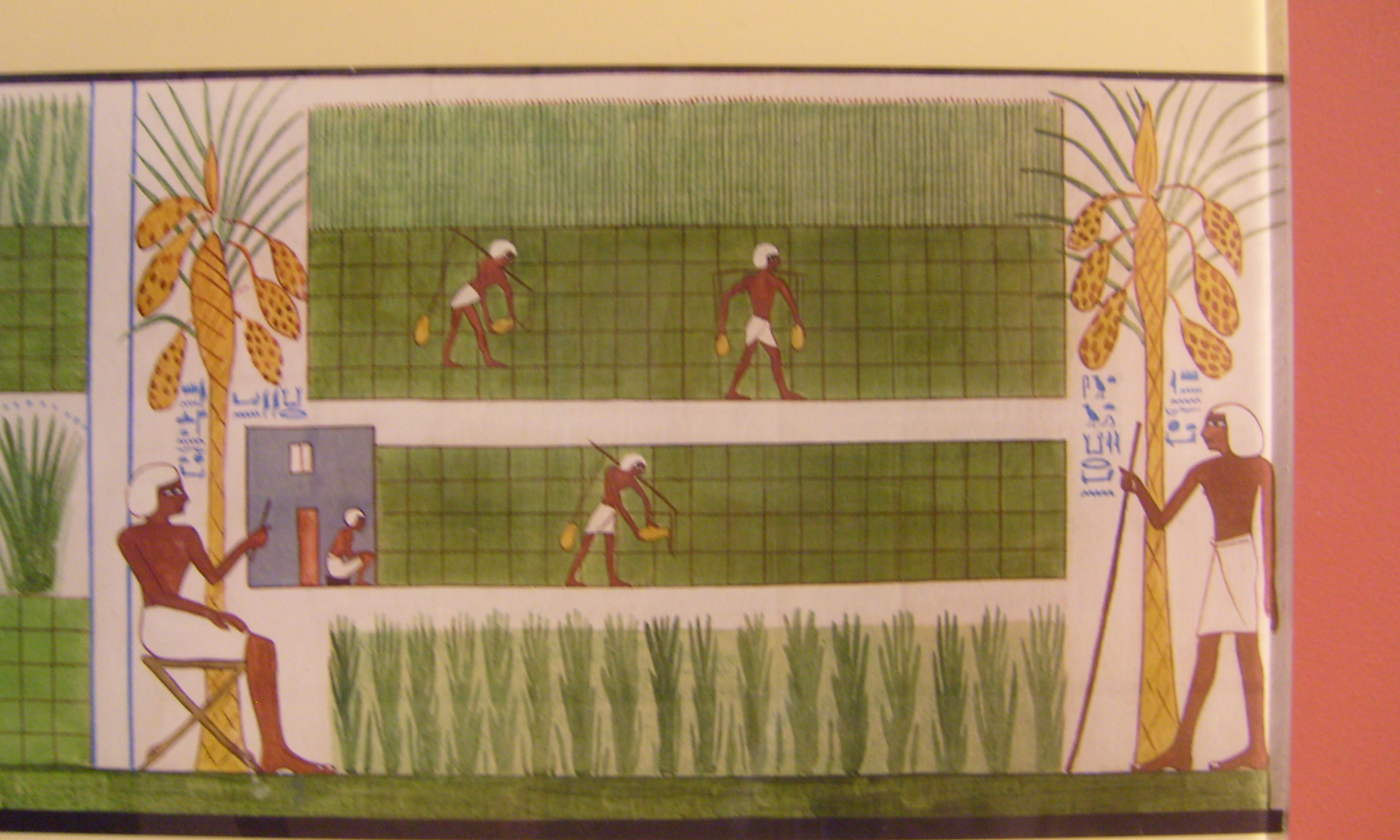
Gardens of Amun at the Temple of Karnak, a mural in the tomb of Nakh, the chief gardener, early 14th century BC

== Gardening in ancient Egypt ==
Gardening in ancient Egypt required tremendous amounts of dedication and attention; gardens required constant irrigation, with water carried or lifted by hand, weeding, and tending, including the artificial propagation of date palms, which required great skill. Great effort was also needed to keep birds from eating the crops. Ingenious traps were set to catch the invading birds.

== Bibliography ==
- Ian Shaw and Paul Nicholson, The British Museum Dictionary of Ancient Egypt, British Museum Press, 1995.
- Michel Baridon, Les Jardins – Paysagistes- Jardiniers – Poetes. Editions Robert Lafont, 1998. (ISBN 2-221-06707-X)
- Jan Assmann, David Lorton,"Death and salvation in ancient Egypt", Translated by David Lorton, p171, Cornell University Press, 2005, ISBN 0801442419
- Daniel Zohary and Maria Hopf, Domestication of plants in the Old World, third edition (Oxford: University Press, 2000).
- C. Desroches-Noblecourt, L’Art Egyptien, PUF, Paris, 1962.
- J.C. Hugonot, Le Jardin dans l’Egypte ancienne, Peter Lang, Paris, 1989.
- Wilkinson, Alix. “Symbolism and Design in Ancient Egyptian Gardens.” Garden History 22, no. 1 (1994): 1–17.
- Shmuel Burmil (2007) Gardens in the oases of Egypt's Western Desert, and their similarities to ancient Egyptian gardens, Studies in the History of Gardens & Designed Landscapes, 27:1, 77-85
- Patrick Bowe (2019) Garden making in the first millennium BCE, Studies in the History of Gardens & Designed Landscapes, 39:4, 351-365
