= Index of gardening articles =

This is an alphabetical index of articles related to gardening.

== A ==
Aeroponics - African Violet Society of America - Akadama - Alkali soil - Allotment - Alpine garden - Alpine plant - Amateur Gardening - Andalusian patio - Annual plant - Aquaponics - Aquascaping - Aquatic plant - Aquatic weed harvester - Arboretum - Arboriculture - Artificial turf - Artificial waterfall - Atomic gardening - Auckland Flower Show - Australian Organic Farming and Gardening Society - Avenue - Averruncator - Award of Garden Merit - Axe

== B ==
Backcrossing - Back garden - Bāgh - Bare root - Baroque garden - Basal shoot - BBC Gardeners' World - Bedding (horticulture) - Belvedere - Beneficial insect - Beneficial weed - Berry-picking rake - Biblical garden - Bibliography of hedges and topiary - Biennial bearing - Biennial plant - Biofertilizer - Bioherbicide - Biological pest control - Biopesticide - Birth flower - Bitter pit - Blackheart - Black rot - Blanching - Bletting - Blight - Blossom - Bog garden - Bokashi - Bolting - Bonded Fibre Matrix - Bonsai - Bonsai aesthetics - Bonsai styles - Boron deficiency - Bosquet - Botanical garden - Bottle garden - Bridge graft - Britain in Bloom - Broadcast seeding - Broadfork - Broadleaf weeds - Broderie (garden feature) - Brown patch - Brushcutter - Bulb - Bulldog Tools - Bundesgartenschau - Butterfly gardening - Byzantine gardens

== C ==
Cachepot - Cactus garden - Calcium deficiency - California native plants - Canadian Tulip Festival - Canadian Gardening - Carpellody - Celebrity gardener - Centre for Wildlife Gardening - Chance seedling - Charbagh - Chelsea Flower Show - Chelsea Fringe - Cherry blossom - Chilling requirement - Chinampa - Chinese garden - Chip budding - Chlorosis - Climate-friendly gardening - Clipping - Cloche - Cloud tree - Cold frame - Collective landscape - Colonial Revival garden - Color garden - Computer-aided garden design - Communal garden - Community gardening - Community gardens in Nebraska - Community orchard - Companion planting - Complete English Gardener - Compost - Concours des villes et villages fleuris - Concrete landscape curbing - Conservation and restoration of historic gardens Container garden - Controlled-release fertiliser - Controller (irrigation) - Copper tape - Cornish hedge - Corn maze - Cottage garden - Crop - Crop protection - Crop rotation - Cultigen - Cultivar - Cultivar group - Cultivated plant taxonomy - Cultivator - Cushion plant - Cut flowers - Cutting

== D ==
Daffodil Society - Daisy grubber - Deadheading - Dead hedge - Deadwood bonsai techniques - Deciduous - Deep water culture - Defensible space (fire control) - Deficit irrigation - Deflowering - Defoliant - Desert greening - Devon hedge - Dibber - Disease resistance in fruit and vegetables - Division - Double digging - Double-flowered - Drip irrigation - Drought tolerance - Dutch garden

== E ==
Ecoscaping - Edger - Elevated park - Energy-efficient landscaping - English landscape garden - Entente Florale - Environmental design - Ephemeral plant - Ericaceous fertilizer - Espalier - Evergreen - Evolutionary history of plants - Expo 2016 - Eyecatchers

== F ==
Fairy ring - False vivipary - Fence - Ferme ornée - Fernery - Fertigation - Fertilizer - Fertilizer burn - Fine Gardening - Floral clock - Floral design - Floral diagram - Floral formula - Floral industry - Floral scent - Floriade - Floribunda - Floriculture - Floriculture in Canada - Florissimo - Floristic diversity - Floristry - Flower - Flower bouquet - Flower box - Flower bulb cultivation in the Netherlands - Flower delivery - Flower frog - Flower garden - Flowering plant - Flowerpot - Flower preservation - Fogponics - Foliar feeding - Foliar nutrient - Folkewall - Folly - Foodscaping - Forest gardening - Formal garden - Fountain - Fountaineer - French formal garden - French intensive gardening - French landscape garden - Front garden - Fruit - Fruit tree - Fruit tree forms - Fruit tree propagation - Fruit tree pruning - Fusarium patch

== G ==
Garden - Garden at Buckingham Palace - Garden-based learning - Garden buildings - Garden centre - Garden city movement - Garden club - Garden Culture - Garden design - Garden designer - Garden festival - Garden fork - Garden furniture - Garden guns - Garden hermit - Garden History Society - Garden hose - Garden leave - Garden Museum - Garden of Alcinous - Garden of Eden - Garden office - Garden ornament - Garden pond - Garden railway - Garden real estate - Garden room - Garden roses - Garden sharing - Garden sanctuary - Garden square - Garden structure - Garden tool - Garden tourism - Garden waste dumping - Garden window - Garden World Images - Garden writing - Gardena (company) - Gardener - Gardeners' Question Time - Gardeners' World - Gardeners' World Live - Gardenesque - Gardening - Gardening Australia - Gardening in Alaska - Gardening in New Zealand - Gardening in restricted spaces - Gardening in Scotland - Gardening in Spain - Gardening Naturally - Gardens of ancient Egypt - Gardens of Provence-Alpes-Côte d'Azur - Gardens of Sallust - Gardens of the French Renaissance - Gardens of Versailles - Gazebo - Genetically modified tree - German garden - Germination - Giardino all'italiana - Gloriette - Gongshi - Grafting - Grafting wax - Grandi Giardini Italiani - Grasscycling - Grass shears - Grass stitcher - Gravel - Greek gardens - Greenhouse - Green roof - Green wall - Green waste - Grex - Grotto - Groundcover - Groundskeeping - Growbag - Grow box - Growing degree-day - Growing region - Growing season - Grow shop - Grow light - Growroom - Growstones - Guerrilla gardening - Gumbo

== H ==
Haga trädgård - Ha-ha - Halophyte - Hameau de la Reine - Hampton Court Palace Flower Show - Hand tool - Hanging basket - Hanging garden - Hanging Gardens of Babylon - Hardiness - Hardiness zone - Hard landscape materials - Hardscape - Hardpan - Head gardener - Hedge - Hedgelaying - Hedge maze - Hedge trimmer - Heirloom plant - Herb - Herbaceous border - Herbaceous plant - Herbal - Herbalism - Herbal tea - Herbarium - Herbchronology - Herb farm - Herbicide - Heritage gardens in Australia - Hilling - Historical hydroculture - History of fertilizer - History of flower arrangement - History of gardening - History of herbalism - History of landscape architecture - History of plant breeding - History of plant systematics - Hoe - Hook - Horaisan - Hori hori - Horticultural botany - Horticultural fleece - Horticultural flora - Horticultural oil - Horticultural society - Horticultural therapy - Horticulture - Horticulture industry - Horti Fair - Horti Lamiani - Hortus conclusus - Hotbed - Hot container composting - Houseplant - Houseplant care - Hügelkultur - Human uses of plants - Hybrid name - Hybrid seed - Hybrid tea rose - Hydroponics - Hydroseeding - Hydrozoning

== I ==
Ice pruning - Ikebana - Indigenous horticulture - Inflorescence - Infructescence - Insectary plant - Integrated pest management - Intensive gathering - Intercropping - Intercultural Garden - International Code of Nomenclature for algae, fungi, and plants - International Code of Nomenclature for Cultivated Plants - International Garden Festival - Introduced species - Invasive species - Iron deficiency - Irrigation sprinkler - Islamic garden - Italian Renaissance garden

== J ==
Japanese garden - Japanese rock garden - Jardiniere - Jeux d'eau

== K ==
Kenzan - Keyhole garden - Kirpi - Kitchen garden - Knot garden - Korean flower arrangement - Korean garden - Kokedama - Kunai - Kusamono and shitakusa

== L ==
Landscape - Landscape architect - Landscape architecture - Landscape contracting - Landscape design - Landscape detailing - Landscape engineering - Landscape fabric - Landscape garden - Landscape lighting - Landscape maintenance - Landscape manager - Landscape planning - Landscape products - Landscaping - Language of flowers - Lawn - Lawn aerator - Lawn mower - Lawn ornament - Lawn sweeper - Layering - Leaf - Leaf blower - Leaf mold - Leaf scorch - Leaf spot - Leaf vegetable - Legume - Limbing - Linear aeration - Linear park - Liners - Lingnan garden - Living mulch - Living root bridges - Loam - Loppers - Love Your Garden

== M ==
Manganese deficiency - Marcescence - Market garden - Mary garden - Master gardener program - Matrix planting - Mattock - Maze - Mechanical weed control - Medicinal plants - Melbourne International Flower and Garden Show - Microbudding - Micro-irrigation - Microtubing - Molybdenum deficiency - Monastic garden - Monocarpic - Monopteros - Moon bridge - Moon gate - Mosaiculture - Mother plant - Mughal gardens - Mulch - Multiple cropping - Multipurpose tree

== N ==
National Garden Festival - National Tulip Day - Native plant - Natural landscaping - Naturescaping - Nature therapy - Nematode - Nitrogen deficiency - Niwaki - No-dig gardening - Noxious weed - Nurse grafting

== O ==
Offset - Olericulture - Orchard - Orchidelirium - Orangery - Organic fertilizer - Organic hydroponics - Organic horticulture - Organic lawn management - Organic movement - Ornamental bulbous plant - Ornamental grass - Ornamental plant - Orthodox seed

== P ==
P-Patch - Palmetum - Palm house - Paradise garden - Parasitic plant - Parterre - Passive hydroponics - Patio garden - Patte d'oie - Pattern gardening - Pavilion - Perennial plant - Pergola - Peristyle - Permaculture - Persian gardens - Persian powder - Pest control - Pesticide - Pesticide application - Pesticide drift - Pesticide resistance - Philosophical garden - Phosphorus deficiency - Photosynthesis - Physic garden - Physiological plant disorder - Phytotron - Picotee - Pineapple pit - Plant - Plant anatomy - Plant breeders' rights - Plant breeding - Plant collecting - Plant community - Plant disease forecasting - Plant disease resistance - Plant ecology - Plant factory - Plant hormone - Plant identification - Plant LED incubator - Plantlet - Plant litter - Plant morphology - Plant nursery - Plant pathology - Plant propagation - Plant taxonomy - Plant tissue culture - Plant variety (law) - Plantsman - Plasticulture - Plastic mulch - Playscape - Pleaching - Pleasure garden - Pollarding - Pollination - Pollinator garden - Polyculture - Polytunnel - Pond liner - Post-harvest losses - Post hole digger - Potassium deficiency - Pot farming - Pot-in-pot - Potting bench - Potting soil - Precision seeding - Pruning - Pruning shears - Pseudanthium - Pulse drip irrigation

== Q ==
- Quiet area

== R ==
Rain garden - Rainwater harvesting - Raised bed gardening - Rake - Reflecting pool - Remontancy - Rhubarb forcer - Ring culture - Ripening - Robotic lawn mower - Rock garden - Roji - Roman garden - Roof garden - Root - Root barrier - Root rot - Rootstock - Root trainer - Rose - Rose (symbolism) - Rose garden - Rose hip - Rose show - Rose trial grounds - Row cover - Royal Botanic Society - Royal Horticultural Society - Rubber mulch

== S ==
Sacred garden - Sacred herb - Salt pruning - School garden - Sculpture garden - Season extension - Seawater greenhouse - Seed - Seed ball - Seedbed - Seed dormancy - Seedling - Seed orchard - Seed saving - Seed swap - Seed testing - Self-pollination - Semi-deciduous - Sensory garden - Shade garden - Shade tree - Shakespeare garden - Sharawadgi - Shed - Sheet mulching - Shell grotto - Shishi-odoshi - Shoot - Shovel - Shredding - Shrewsbury Flower Show - Shrub - Shrubbery - Sichuanese garden - Silver sand - Singapore Garden Festival - Slow gardening - Smudge pot - Snow mold - Sod - Sod roof - Soft landscape materials - Softscape - Soil - Soil conditioner - Soil conservation - Soil defertilisation - Soil fertility - Soil life - Soil moisture sensor - Soil pH - Soil test - Soil type - Southport Flower Show - Sowing - Space in landscape design - Spade - Spanish garden - Species description - Specific replant disease - Spent mushroom compost - Sprigging - Sprouting - Square foot gardening - Stale seed bed - Statuary - Stepping stones - Strewing herb - String trimmer - Stumpery - Sub-irrigated planter - Subshrub - Subsoil - Succession planting - Sustainable gardening - Sustainable landscape architecture - Sustainable landscaping - Sustainable planting - Synergistic gardening - Succulents gardening

== T ==
Taihu stone - Tapestry lawn - Taproot - Tatton Park Flower Show - Tea garden - Telegarden - Terrace garden - Thatch - The Profitable Arte of Gardening - Therapeutic garden - Thinning - Three Great Gardens of Japan - Tomato grafting - Topiary - Topsoil - Tōrō - Tower Garden - Transplant experiment - Transplanting - Trap crop - Tree - Tree paint - Tree planting - Tree shaping - Tree shelter - Tree topping - Trellis - Trial garden - Tropical garden - Triple mix - Trowel - Tuileries Garden - Tulip festival - Turf - Turf maze - Turf melting out

== U ==
Upside-down gardening - Urban horticulture - Uses of compost

== V ==
Variegation - Variety - Vascular plant - Vase life - Vegan organic gardening - Vegetable bouquet - Vegetable farming - Vegetative reproduction - Vermicompost - Vernalization - Vertical farming - Victory garden - Vine - Vine training - Vivarium - Volunteer

== W ==
Walled garden - Waru Waru - Water feature - Water garden - Water sprout - Water timer - Watering can - Weed - Weed control - Weeder - Weed of cultivation - Weed science - Wheelbarrow - Wilderness (garden history) Wildflower - Wildlife garden - Wilting - Windbreak - Window box - Windowfarm - Winter garden - Winter sowing - Withy - Woodchipper - Woodland garden - Woody plant - Worshipful Company of Gardeners

== X ==
Xeriscaping

== Y ==
Yates (company) - Yukitsuri

== Z ==
Zen garden - Zero-turn mower - Zig zag bridge - Zinc deficiency

== Lists ==
Botanical gardens - Chinese gardens - Companion plants - Culinary herbs and spices - Domesticated plants - Edible flowers - Foliage plant diseases - Fungicides - Garden and horticulture books - Garden features - Garden plants - Garden types - Gardens - Gardens in England - Gardens in Italy - Gardens in Scotland - Gardens in Wales - Herbs with known adverse effects - Horticultural magazines - Horticulture and gardening books/publications - Invasive species - Landscape architects - Landscape gardens - Leaf vegetables - Organic gardening and farming topics - Pests and diseases of roses - Pest-repelling plants - Plant hybrids - Plant orders - Plants by common name - Plants used in herbalism - Poisonous plants - Professional gardeners - Remarkable Gardens of France - Root vegetables - Rosa species - Sensory gardens - Snowdrop gardens - Lists of cultivars - Lists of plant diseases - Lists of plants - Lists of useful plants

== Category ==
- Category:Gardening

== See also ==
- Glossary of botanical terms
- Glossary of leaf morphology
- Outline of organic gardening and farming
