= Plant nursery =

Facility where plants are propagated and grown to usable size

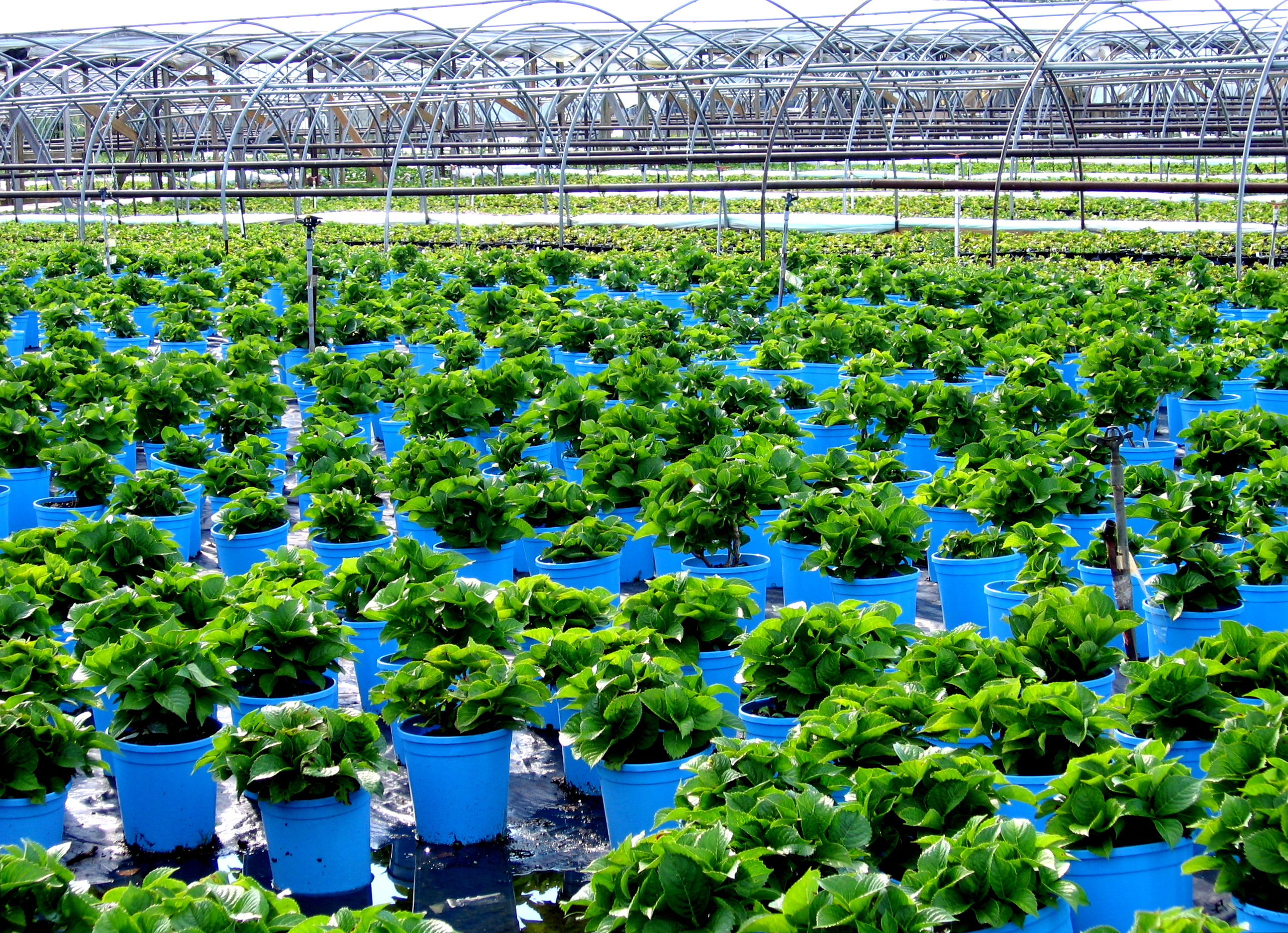
Plants in a nursery

A nursery is a place where plants are propagated and grown to a desired size. Mostly the plants concerned are for gardening, forestry, or conservation biology, rather than agriculture. They include retail nurseries, which sell to the general public; wholesale nurseries, which sell only to businesses such as other nurseries and commercial gardeners; and private nurseries, which supply the needs of institutions or private estates. Some will also work in plant breeding.

A nurseryman is a person who owns or works in a nursery.

Some nurseries specialize in certain areas, which may include: propagation and the selling of small or bare root plants to other nurseries; growing out plant materials to a saleable size, or retail sales. Nurseries may also specialize in one type of plant, e.g., groundcovers, shade plants, or rock garden plants. Some produce bulk stock, whether seedlings or grafted trees, of particular varieties for purposes such as fruit trees for orchards or timber trees for forestry. Some producers produce stock seasonally, ready in the spring for export to colder regions where propagation could not have been started so early or to regions where seasonal pests prevent profitable growing early in the season.

== Nurseries ==
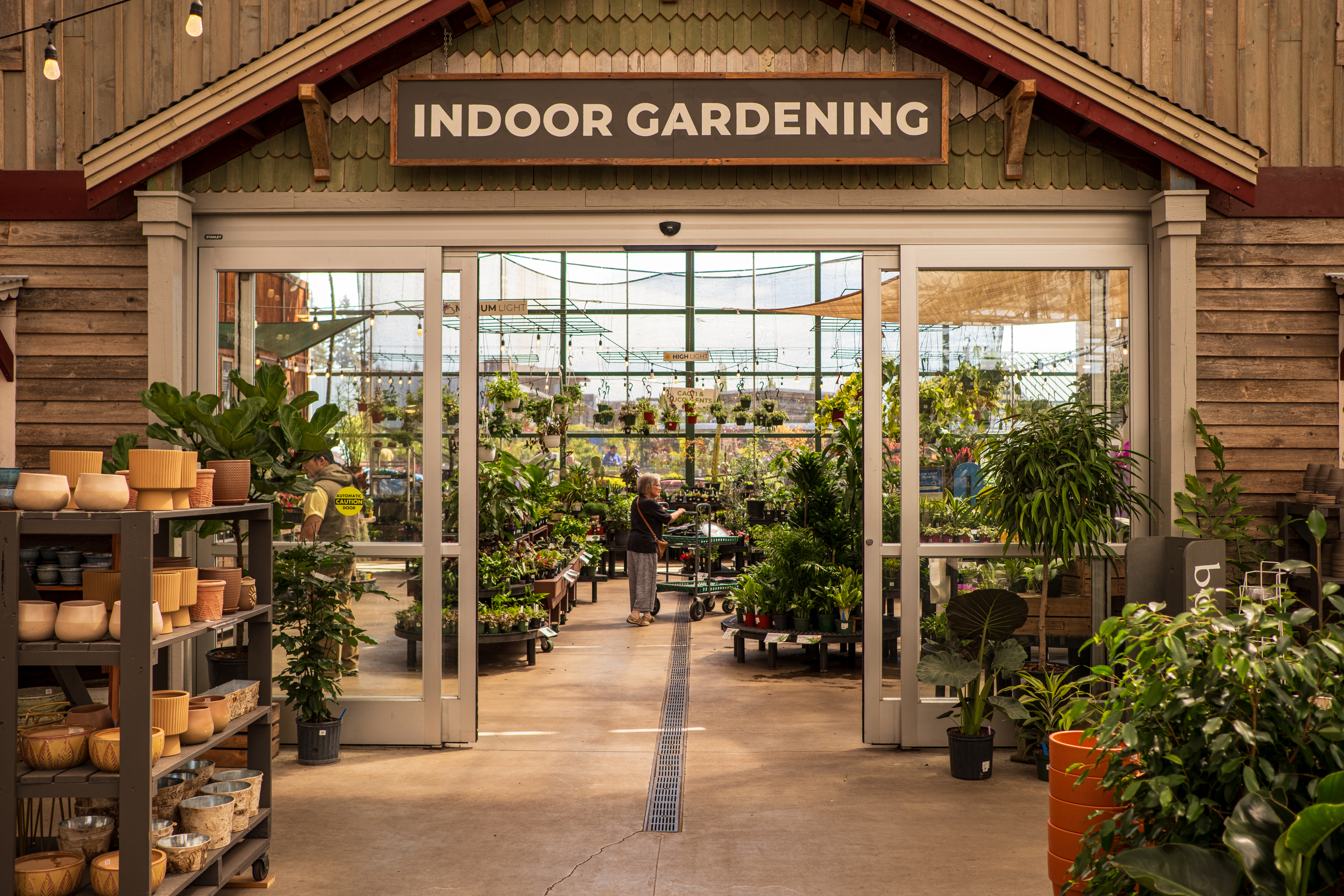
Tthe indoor gardening section of a nursery near Seattle, Washington

There are a number of different types of nurseries, broadly grouped as wholesale or retail nurseries, with some overlap depending on the specific operation. Wholesale nurseries produce plants in large quantities which are sold to retail nurseries

Wholesale nurseries may be small operations that produce a specific type of plant using a small area of land, or very larger operations covering many acres. They propagate plant material or buy plants from other nurseries which may include rooted or unrooted cuttings, or small rooted plants called plugs, or field grown bare root plants, which are planted and grown to a desired size. Some wholesale nurseries produce plants on contract for others which place an order for a specific number and size of plant, while others produce a wide range of plants that are offered for sale to other nurseries and landscapers and sold as first come first served. Retail nurseries sell plants ready to be placed in the landscape or used in homes and businesses.

== Methods ==
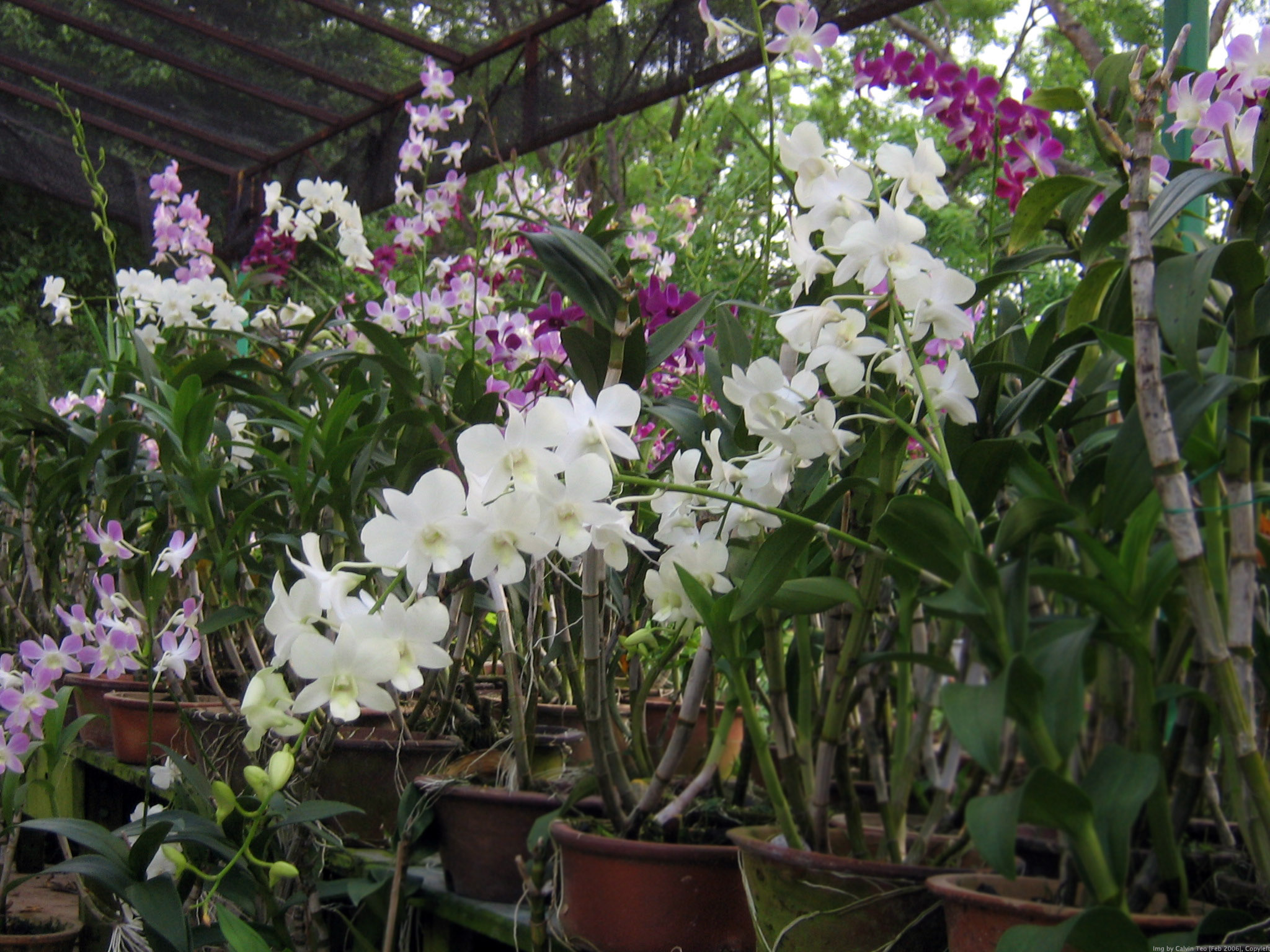
A small nursery filled with orchids in bloom

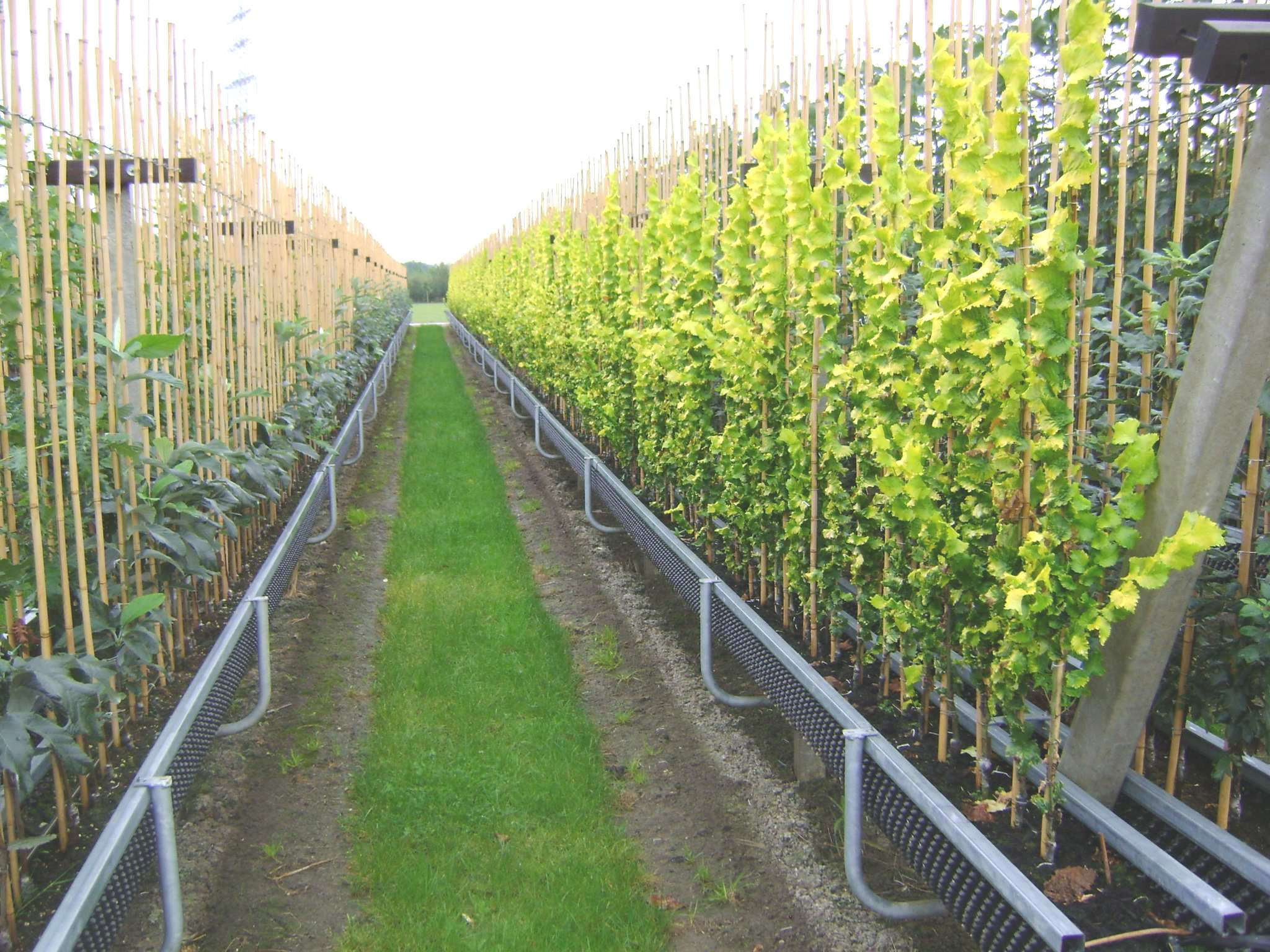
Gutters capturing watering runoff at a tree nursery

Propagation nurseries produce new plants from seeds, cuttings, tissue culture, grafting, or division. The plants are then grown out to a salable size and either sold to other nurseries that may continue to grow the plants out in larger containers or field grow them to desired size. Propagation nurseries may also sell plant material large enough for retail sales and thus sale directly to retail nurseries or garden centers (which rarely propagated their own plants).

Nurseries may produce plants for reforestation, zoos, parks, and cities. Tree nurseries in the U.S. produce around 1.3 billion seedlings per year for reforestation projects.

Nurseries grow plants in open fields, on container fields, in tunnels or greenhouses. In open fields, nurseries grow decorative trees, shrubs and herbaceous perennials. On a containerfield nurseries grow small trees, shrubs and herbaceous plants, usually destined for sales in garden centers. These have proper ventilation, sunlight etc. Plants may be grown by seeds, but the most common method is by planting cuttings, which can be taken from shoot tips or roots.

== Conditioning ==
With the objective of fitting planting stock more able to withstand stresses after outplanting, various nursery treatments have been attempted or developed and applied to nursery stock. Buse and Day (1989), for instance, studied the effect of conditioning of white spruce and black spruce transplants on their morphology, physiology, and subsequent performance after outplanting. Root pruning, wrenching, and fertilization with potassium at 375 kg/ha were the treatments applied. Root pruning and wrenching modified stock in the nursery by decreasing height, root collar diameter, shoot:root ratio, and bud size, but did not improve survival or growth after planting. Fertilization reduced root growth in black spruce but not of white spruce.

== Important factors for nursery production ==
For a nursery to produce healthy crops, they must manage many factors, a few of them being irrigation, landscape topography, and soil conditions of the site.

=== Irrigation ===
Plants need water to grow. Water needs will vary depending on plant species, weather, and soil. An example is in Ontario, irrigation water is used most in late spring and in summer, when plants need water most, and based on climate patterns in Ontario, this time is also when there is the least amount of rainfall. Some nurseries will create water sources by building a dam, or changing a watercourse. or building manmade ponds. The water source and water pumps should to be close to fields In this situation, water will need testing for pH, and testing for chemicals in the water to ensure an acceptable water quality. Two common types of irrigation systems are drip irrigation, and overhead irrigation.

=== Landscape topography ===
A good slope for a plant nursery is 1–2 degrees. Any more than 5 degrees will make the nursery susceptible to soil erosion. The nursery stock should be planted in rows running across the slopes. If the landscape of the nursery has sections of land where erosion could occur, the nursery needs to come up with a solution such as by using erosion prevention structures like rip rap. Topography impacts nursery design and layout and it is a factor in strategizing what direction to plant rows. It also impacts where windbreaks should be planted. If an area has a flat slope and is open, it will need a windbreak.

=== Soil conditions ===
For a nursery to produce healthy crops, it will need to have healthy soil. The soil should have good drainage and nutrient holding capacity. Soil testing will help a nursery find out its pH levels, and also the amounts of nutrients in the soil. To test soil drainage, one method is to dig an 18" deep hole that is at least 4" in diameter. Fill the hole with water, and leave it for an hour. This will allow the soil to saturate. Next, fill the hole with water again but leave the top 2" of soil in the hole without water. Wait an hour then return to the hole with a measurement tool like a ruler to find out how much water has drained from the hole. The corresponding measurements will allow the tester to decide what type of drainage capacity their soil has. If the water level drops 1/2" or less it is poor draining. If water drops 1/2" to 1", it drains at a medium rate. 1"< means that the soil drains quickly.

=== Hardening off, frost hardiness ===
Seedlings vary in their susceptibility to injury from frost. Damage can be catastrophic if "unhardened" seedlings are exposed to frost. Frost hardiness may be defined as the minimum temperature at which a certain percentage of a random seedling population will survive or will sustain a given level of damage (Siminovitch 1963, Timmis and Worrall 1975). The term LT_{50} (lethal temperature for 50% of a population) is commonly used. Determination of frost hardiness in Ontario is based on electrolyte leakage from mainstem terminal tips 2 cm to 3 cm long in weekly samplings (Colombo and Hickie 1987). The tips are frozen then thawed, immersed in distilled water, the electrical conductivity of which depends on the degree to which cell membranes have been ruptured by freezing releasing electrolyte. A −15 °C frost hardiness level has been used to determine the readiness of container stock to be moved outside from the greenhouse, and −40 °C has been the level determining readiness for frozen storage (Colombo 1997).

In an earlier technique, potted seedlings were placed in a freezer chest and cooled to some level for some specific duration; a few days after removal, seedlings were assessed for damage using various criteria, including odour, general visual appearance, and examination of cambial tissue (Ritchie 1982).

Stock for fall planting must be properly hardened-off. Conifer seedlings are considered to be hardened off when the terminal buds have formed and the stem and root tissues have ceased growth. Other characteristics that in some species indicate dormancy are color and stiffness of the needles, but these are not apparent in white spruce.

== Forest tree nurseries ==
Whether in the forest or in the nursery, seedling growth is fundamentally influenced by soil fertility, but nursery soil fertility is readily amenable to amelioration, much more so than is forest soil.

Nitrogen, phosphorus, and potassium are regularly supplied as fertilizers, and calcium and magnesium are supplied occasionally. Applications of fertilizer nitrogen do not build up in the soil to develop any appreciable storehouse of available nitrogen for future crops. Phosphorus and potassium, however, can be accumulated as a storehouse available for extended periods.

Fertilization permits seedling growth to continue longer through the growing season than unfertilized stock; fertilized white spruce attained twice the height of unfertilized. High fertility in the rooting medium favours shoot growth over root growth, and can produce top-heavy seedlings ill-suited to the rigors of the outplant site. Nutrients in oversupply can reduce growth or the uptake of other nutrients. As well, an excess of nutrient ions can prolong or weaken growth to interfere with the necessary development of dormancy and hardening of tissues in time to withstand winter weather.

=== Stock types, sizes and lots ===
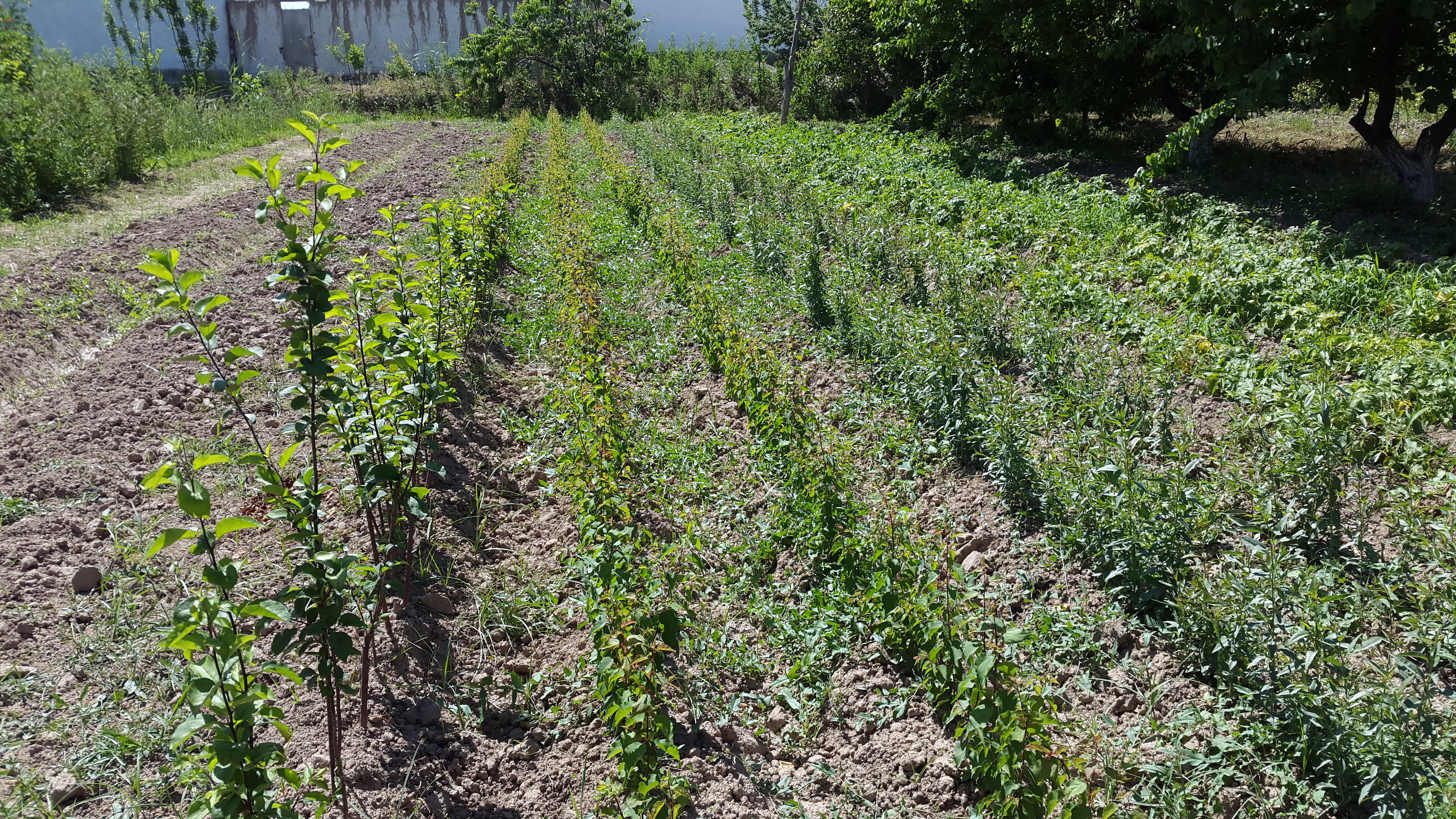
Apricot seedlings in a nursery

Nursery stock size typically follows the normal curve when lifted for planting stock. The runts at the lower end of the scale are usually culled to an arbitrary limit, but, especially among bareroot stock, the range in size is commonly considerable. Dobbs (1976) and McMinn (1985a) examined how the performance of 2+0 bareroot white spruce related to differences in initial size of planting stock. The stock was regraded into large, medium, and small fractions according to fresh weight. The small fraction (20% of the original stock) had barely one-quarter of the dry matter mass of the large fraction at the time of outplanting. Ten years later, in the blade-scarified site, seedlings of the large fraction had almost 50% greater stem volume than had seedlings of the small fraction. Without site preparation, large stock were more than twice the size of small stock after 10 years.

Similar results were obtained with regraded 2+1 transplants sampled to determine root growth capacity. The large stock had higher RGC as well as greater mass than the small stock fraction.

The value of large size at the time of planting is especially apparent when outplants face strong competition from other vegetation, although high initial mass does not guarantee success. That the growth potential of planting stock depends on much more than size seems clear from the indifferent success of the transplanting of small 2+0 seedlings for use as 2+1 "reclaim" transplants. The size of bareroot white spruce seedlings and transplants also had a major influence on field performance.

The field performance among various stock types in Ontario plantations was examined by Paterson and Hutchison (1989): the white spruce stock types were 2+0, 1.5+0.5, 1.5+1.5, and 3+0. The nursery stock was grown at Midhurst Forest Tree Nursery, and carefully handled through lifting on 3 lift dates, packing, and hot-planting into cultivated weed-free loam. After 7 years, overall survival was 97%, with no significant differences in survival among stock types. The 1.5+1.5 stock with a mean height of 234 cm was significantly taller by 18% to 25% than the other stock types. The 1.5+1.5 stock also had significantly greater dbh than the other stock types by 30–43%. The best stock type was 57 cm taller and 1 cm greater in dbh than the poorest. Lifting date had no significant effect on growth or survival.

High elevation sites in British Columbia's southern mountains are characterized by a short growing season, low air and soil temperatures, severe winters, and deep snow. The survival and growth of Engelmann spruce and subalpine fir outplanted in 3 silvicultural trials on such sites in gaps of various sizes were compared by Lajzerowicz et al. (2006). Survival after 5 or 6 years decreased with smaller gaps. Height and diameter also decreased with decreasing size of gap; mean heights were 50 cm to 78 cm after 6 years, in line with height expectations for Engelmann spruce in a high-elevation planting study in southeastern British Columbia. In the larger gaps (≥1.0 ha), height increment by year 6 was ranging from 10 cm to 20 cm. Lajzerrowicz et al. Concluded that plantings of conifers in clearcuts at high elevations in the southern mountains of British Columbia are likely to be successful, even close to timberline; and group selection silvicultural systems based on gaps 0.1 ha or larger are also likely to succeed. Gaps smaller than 0.1 ha do not provide suitable conditions for obtaining adequate survival or for growth of outplanted conifers.

=== Planting stock ===
Planting stock, "seedlings, transplants, cuttings, and occasionally wildings, for use in planting out," is nursery stock that has been made ready for outplanting. The amount of seed used in white spruce seedling production and direct seeding varies with method.

A working definition of planting stock quality was accepted at the 1979 IUFRO Workshop on Techniques for Evaluating Planting Stock Quality in New Zealand: "The quality of planting stock is the degree to which that stock realizes the objectives of management (to the end of the rotation or achievement of specified sought benefits) at minimum cost. Quality is fitness for purpose." Clear expression of objectives is therefore prerequisite to any determination of planting stock quality. Not only does performance have to be determined, but performance has to be rated against the objectives of management. Planting stock is produced in order to give effect to the forest policy of the organization.

A distinction needs to be made between "planting stock quality" and "planting stock performance potential" (PSPP). The actual performance of any given batch of outplanted planting stock is determined only in part by the kind and condition, i.e., the intrinsic PSPP, of the planting stock.

The PSPP is impossible to estimate reliably by eye because outward appearance, especially of stock withdrawn from refrigerated storage, can deceive even experienced foresters, who would be offended if their ability were questioned to recognize good planting stock when they saw it. Prior to Wakeley's (1954) demonstration of the importance of the physiological state of planting stock in determining the ability of the stock to perform after outplanting, and to a considerable extent even afterwards, morphological appearance has generally served as the basis for estimating the quality of planting stock. Gradually, however, a realization developed that more was involved. Tucker et al. (1968), for instance, after assessing 10-year survival data from several experimental white spruce plantations in Manitoba noted that "Perhaps the most important point revealed here is that certain lots of transplants performed better than others", even though all transplants were handled and planted with care. The intuitive "stock that looks good must be good" is a persuasive, but potentially dangerous maxim. That greatest of teachers, Bitter Experience, has often enough demonstrated the fallibility of such assessment, even though the corollary "stock that looks bad must be bad" is likely to be well founded. The physiological qualities of planting stock are hidden from the eye and must be revealed by testing. The potential for survival and growth of a batch of planting stock may be estimated from various features, morphological and physiological, of the stock or a sample thereof.

The size and shape and general appearance of a seedling can nevertheless give useful indications of PSPP. In low-stress outplanting situations, and with a minimized handling and lifting-planting cycle, a system based on specification for nursery stock and minimum morphological standards for acceptable seedlings works tolerably well. In certain circumstances, benefits often accrue from the use of large planting stock of highly ranked morphological grades. Length of leading shoot, diameter of stem, volume of root system, shoot:root ratios, and height:diameter ratios have been correlated with performance under specific site and planting conditions. However, the concept that larger is better negates the underlying complexities. Schmidt-Vogt (1980), for instance, found that whereas mortality among large outplants is greater than among small in the year of planting, mortality in subsequent growing seasons is higher among small outplants than among large. Much of the literature on comparative seedling performance is clouded by uncertainty as to whether the stocks being compared share the same physiological condition; differences invalidate such comparisons.

Height and root-collar diameter are generally accepted as the most useful morphological criteria and are often the only ones used in specifying standards. Quantification of root system morphology is difficult but can be done, e.g. by using the photometric rhizometer to determine intercept area, or volume by displacement or gravimetric methods.

Planting stock is always subject to a variety of conditions that are never optimal in toto. The effect of sub-optimal conditions is to induce stress in the plants. The nursery manager aims, and is normally able to avoid stresses greater than moderate, i.e., restricting stresses to levels that can be tolerated by the plants without incurring serious damage. The adoption of nursery regimes to equip planting stock with characteristics conferring increased ability to withstand outplanting stresses, by managing stress levels in the nursery to "condition" planting stock to increase tolerance to various post-planting environmental stresses, has become widespread, particularly with containerized stock.

Outplanted stock that is unable to tolerate high temperatures occurring at soil surfaces will fail to establish on many forest sites, even in the far north. Factors affecting heat tolerance were investigated by Colombo et al. (1995); the production and roles of heat shock proteins (HSPs) are important in this regard. HSPs, present constitutively in black spruce and many other, perhaps most, higher plants are important both for normal cell functioning and in a stress response mechanism following exposure to high, non-lethal temperature. In black spruce at least, there is an association between HSPs and increased levels of heat tolerance. Investigation of the diurnal variability in heat tolerance of roots and shoots in black spruce seedlings 14 to 16 weeks old found in all 4 trials that shoot heat tolerance was significantly greater in the afternoon than in the morning. The trend in root heat tolerance was similar to that found in the shoots; root systems exposed to 47 °C for 15 minutes in the afternoon averaged 75 new roots after a 2-week growth period, whereas only 28 new roots developed in root systems similarly exposed in the morning. HSP_{73} was detected in black spruce nuclear, mitochondrial, microsomal, and soluble protein fractions, while HSP_{72} was observed only in the soluble protein fraction. Seedlings exhibited constitutive synthesis of HSP_{73} at 26 °C in all except the nuclear membrane fraction in the morning; HSP levels at 26 °C in the afternoon were higher than in the morning in the mitochondrial and microsomal protein factions. Heat shock affected the abundance of HSPs depending on protein fraction and time of day. Without heat shock, nuclear membrane-bound HSP_{73} was absent from plants in the morning and only weakly present in the afternoon, and heat shock increased the abundance of nuclear membrane. Heat shock also affected the abundance of HSP_{73} in the afternoon, and caused HSP_{73} to appear in the morning. In the mitochondrial and microsomal protein fractions, an afternoon heat shock reduced HSP_{73}, whereas a morning heat shock increased HSP_{73} in the mitochondrial but decreased it in the microsomal fraction. Heat shock increased soluble HSP_{72/73} levels in both the morning and afternoon. In all instances, shoot and root heat tolerances were significantly greater in the afternoon than in the morning.

Planting stock continues to respire during storage even if frozen. Temperature is the major factor controlling the rate, and care must be taken to avoid overheating. Navratil (1982) found that closed containers in cold storage averaged internal temperatures 1.5 °C to 2.0 °C above the nominal storage temperature. Depletion of reserves can be estimated from the decrease in dry weight. Cold-stored 3+0 white spruce nursery stock in northern Ontario had lost 9% to 16% of dry weight after 40 days of storage. Carbohydrates can also be determined directly.

The propensity of a root system to develop new roots or extend existing roots cannot be determined by eye, yet it is the factor that makes or breaks the outcome of an outplanting operation. The post-planting development of roots or root systems of coniferous planting stock is determined by many factors, some physiological, some environmental. Unsatisfactory rates of post-planting survival unrelated to the morphology of the stock, led to attempts to test the physiological condition of planting stock, particularly to quantify the propensity to produce new root growth. New root growth can be assumed to be necessary for successful establishment of stock after planting, but although the thesis that RGC is positively related to field performance would seem to be reasonable, supporting evidence has been meager.

The physiological condition of seedlings is reflected by changes in root activity. This is helpful in determining the readiness of stock for lifting and storing and also for outplanting after storage. Navratil (1982) reported a virtually perfect (R² = 0.99) linear relationship in the frequency of 3+0 white spruce white root tips longer than 10 mm with time in the fall at Pine Ridge Forest Nursery, Alberta, decreasing during a 3-week period to zero on October 13 in 1982.Root regenerating research with white spruce in Canada (Hambly 1973, Day and MacGillivray 1975, Day and Breunig 1997) followed similar lines to that of Stone's (1955) pioneering work in California.

Simpson and Ritchie (1997) debated the proposition that root growth potential of planting stock predicts field performance; their conclusion was that root growth potential, as a surrogate for seedling vigor, can predict field performance, but only under such situations as site conditions permit. Survival after planting is only partly a function of an outplant's ability to initiate roots in test conditions; root growth capacity is not the sole predictor of plantation performance.

Some major problems militate against greater use of RGC in forestry, including: unstandardized techniques; unstandardized quantification; uncertain correlation between quantified RGC and field performance; variability within given, nominally identical, kinds of planting stock; and the irrelevance of RGC test values determined on a sub-sample of a parent population that subsequently, before it is planted, undergoes any substantive physiological or physical change. In its present form, RGC testing is silviculturally useful chiefly as a means of detecting planting stock that, while visually unimpaired, is moribund.

Seedling moisture content can be increased or decreased in storage, depending on various factors including especially the type of container and the kind and amount of moisture-retaining material present. When seedlings exceed 20 bars PMS in storage, survival after outplanting becomes problematical. The relative moisture content (RMC) of stock lifted during dry conditions can be increased gradually when stored in appropriate conditions. white spruce (3+0) packed in Kraft bags in northern Ontario increased RMC by 20% to 36% within 40 days.

Bareroot 1.5+1.5 white spruce were taken from cold storage and planted early in May on a clear-felled boreal forest site in northeastern Ontario. Similar plants were potted and kept in a greenhouse. In outplanted trees, maximum stomatal conductances (g) were initially low (<0.01 cm/s), and initial base xylem pressure potentials (PSIb) were -2.0 MPa. During the growing season, g increased to about 0.20 cm/s and PSIb to -1.0 MPa. Minimum xylem pressure potential (PSIm) was initially -2.5 MPa, increasing to -2.0 MPa on day 40, and about -1.6 MPa by day 110. During the first half of the growing season, PSIm was below turgor loss point. The osmotic potential at turgor loss point decreased after planting to -2.3 MPa 28 days later. In the greenhouse, minimum values of PSIT were -2.5 MPa (in the first day after planting. the maximum bulk modulus of elasticity was greater in white spruce than in similarly treated jack pine and showed greater seasonal changes. Relative water content (RWC) at turgor loss was 80–87%. Available turgor (TA), defined as the integral of turgor over the range of RWC between PSIb and xylem pressure potential at the turgor loss point) was 4.0% for white spruce at the beginning of the season compared with 7.9% for jack pine, but for the rest of the season TA for jack pine was only 2%, to 3% that of white spruce. Diurnal turgor (Td), the integral of turgor over the range of RWC between PSIb and PSIm, as a percentage of TA was higher in field-planted white spruce than jack pine until the end of the season.

The stomata of both white and black spruce were more sensitive to atmospheric evaporative demands and plant moisture stress during the first growing season after outplanting on 2 boreal sites in northern Ontario than were jack pine stomata, physiological differences that favoured growth and establishment being more in jack pine than in the spruces.

With black spruce and jack pine, but not with white spruce, Grossnickle and Blake's (1987) findings warrant mention in relation to the bareroot-containerized debate. During the first growing season after outplanting, containerized seedlings of both species had greater needle conductance than bareroot seedlings over a range of absolute humidity deficits. Needle conductance of containerized seedlings of both species remained high during periods of high absolute humidity deficits and increasing plant moisture stress. Bareroot outplants of both species had a greater early season resistance to water-flow through the soil–plant–atmosphere continuum (SPAC) than had containerized outplants. Resistance to water flow through the SPAC decreased in bareroot stock of both species as the season progressed, and was comparable to containerized seedlings 9 to 14 weeks after planting. Bareroot black spruce had greater new-root development than containerized stock throughout the growing season.

The greater efficiency of water use in newly transplanted 3-year-old white spruce seedlings under low levels of absolute humidity difference in water-stressed plants immediately after planting helps explain the commonly observed favourable response of young outplants to the nursing effect of a partial canopy. Silvicultural treatments promoting higher humidity levels at the planting microsite should improve white spruce seedling photosynthesis immediately after planting.

=== Stock types (Seedling nomenclature) ===
Planting stock is grown under many diverse nursery culture regimes, in facilities ranging from sophisticated computerized greenhouses to open compounds. Types of stock include bareroot seedlings and transplants, and various kinds of containerized stock. For simplicity, both container-grown and bareroot stock are generally referred to as seedlings, and transplants are nursery stock that have been lifted and transplanted into another nursery bed, usually at wider spacing. The size and physiological character of stock vary with the length of growing period and with growing conditions. Until the technology of raising containerized nursery stock bourgeoned in the second half of the twentieth- century, bareroot planting stock classified by its age in years was the norm.

=== Classification by age ===
The number of years spent in the nursery seedbed by any particular lot of planting stock is indicated by the 1st of a series of numbers. The 2nd number indicates the years subsequently spent in the transplant line, and a zero is shown if indeed there has been no transplanting. A 3rd number, if any, would indicate the years subsequently spent after a second lifting and transplanting. The numbers are sometimes separated by dashes, but separation by plus sign is more logical inasmuch as the sum of the individual numbers gives the age of the planting stock. Thus 2+0 is 2-year-old seedling planting stock that has not been transplanted, and Candy's (1929) white spruce 2+2+3 stock had spent 2 years in the seedbed, 2 years in transplant lines, and another 3 years in transplant lines after a second transplanting. Variations have included such self-explanatory combinations, such as 1½+1½, etc.

The class of planting stock to use on a particular site is generally selected on the basis of historical record of survival, growth, and total cost of surviving trees. In the Lake States, Kittredge concluded that good stock of 2+1 white spruce was the smallest size likely to succeed and was better than larger and more expensive stock when judged by final cost of surviving trees.

=== Classification by seedling description code ===
Because age alone is an inadequate descriptor of planting stock, various codes have been developed to describe such components of stock characteristics as height, stem diameter, and shoot:root ratio. A description code may include an indication of the intended planting season.

=== Physiological characteristics ===
Neither age classification nor seedling description code indicate the physiological condition of planting stock, though rigid adherence to a given cultural regime together with observation of performance over a number of years of planting can produce stock suitable for performing on a "same again" basis.

=== Classification by production system ===
Nursery plant material is sold using a variety of systems. The most common systems for woody plants are bare root, containers, and ball & burlap. There are manuals specifically for the production of bare root and containerized crops In North America, the American Standard for Nursery Stock (ANSI Z.60.1) and the Canadian nursery stock standard set specifications that determine what category of size a nursery plant material belongs. The categories relate to size of the plant, plant calliper and` height ratio, and the size of the root ball.

If plant stock is grown in a pot of any size or material, it is considered container grown plant stock. the benefits of using the system of container grown plant stock include the convenience of being able to maintain and transport the plant stock. However, container grown plant stock will develop poor root structure when the roots hit the side of the container and begin to circle. When the roots circle the pot, the plant is considered root bound. Container grown plant stock may be grown to size in the field and transplanted into a container, or grown in a container until marketable size if grown in container rather than a field, continual upsizing of pots will be important for preventing the plant becoming root bound. Some ways to prevent a crop from becoming root bound is by using air-pruning containers, which have spaces around the pot that expose growing media and roots to air. The air will stop the root tip from growing and circling the pot. Nurseries will also mechanically prune roots with "U" shaped or linear blades that are connected to tractors. Container production can be used for any plant species.

If a nursery plant is sold as "bare root", it means that soil has been removed from the roots, the product being sold is just the plant. Plants sold as bare root are marketed in the winter, to sell to customers in spring. Plants sold as bare root include herbaceous and woody perennial plants. Bare root plants are grown in the field during the growing season until they become a harvestable bare root crop. During dormancy, bare root plants are dug up, bundled, stored in a cool warehouse with roots in a moist media, they will be sold, transplanted back into the field in spring, or disposed of if there is not enough space in the field. The issue of being root bound is non existent for bare root plants because there is no container for the roots to circle around, bare root nursery stock has the standard of being free of root deformities, and being free of pests.

If a plant is ball and burlapped, it means the nursery dug around the plant with its soil while it's in the field and wrapped it in burlap which they tie down with rope. Nurseries may also use wire baskets to support the ball and burlap trees if needed. Ball and burlap trees loose close to 90% of their root systems when dug The size of the root ball of a ball and burlap tree depends on the calliper of the tree, and the species of the tree. Root balls must have the depth to keep most of the plant root system and also be deep enough to keep plant root ball intact while the plant is being moved or planted.

There are terms used to identify the stage that the nursery plants are at. Liners are young plants that are one or two years old. They may be sold as bare root or in containers. A whip is a tree with just a trunk and little to no branches. Whips can be grown from hardwood cuttings, seedlings, or propagated by budding, which is a method of grafting propagation where a single bud of a desired cultivar is grafted onto a rootstock plant. In the case of budding, the rootstock will be older than the crown.

== See also ==
- Seed orchard
