= Cachepot =

Type of flowerpot

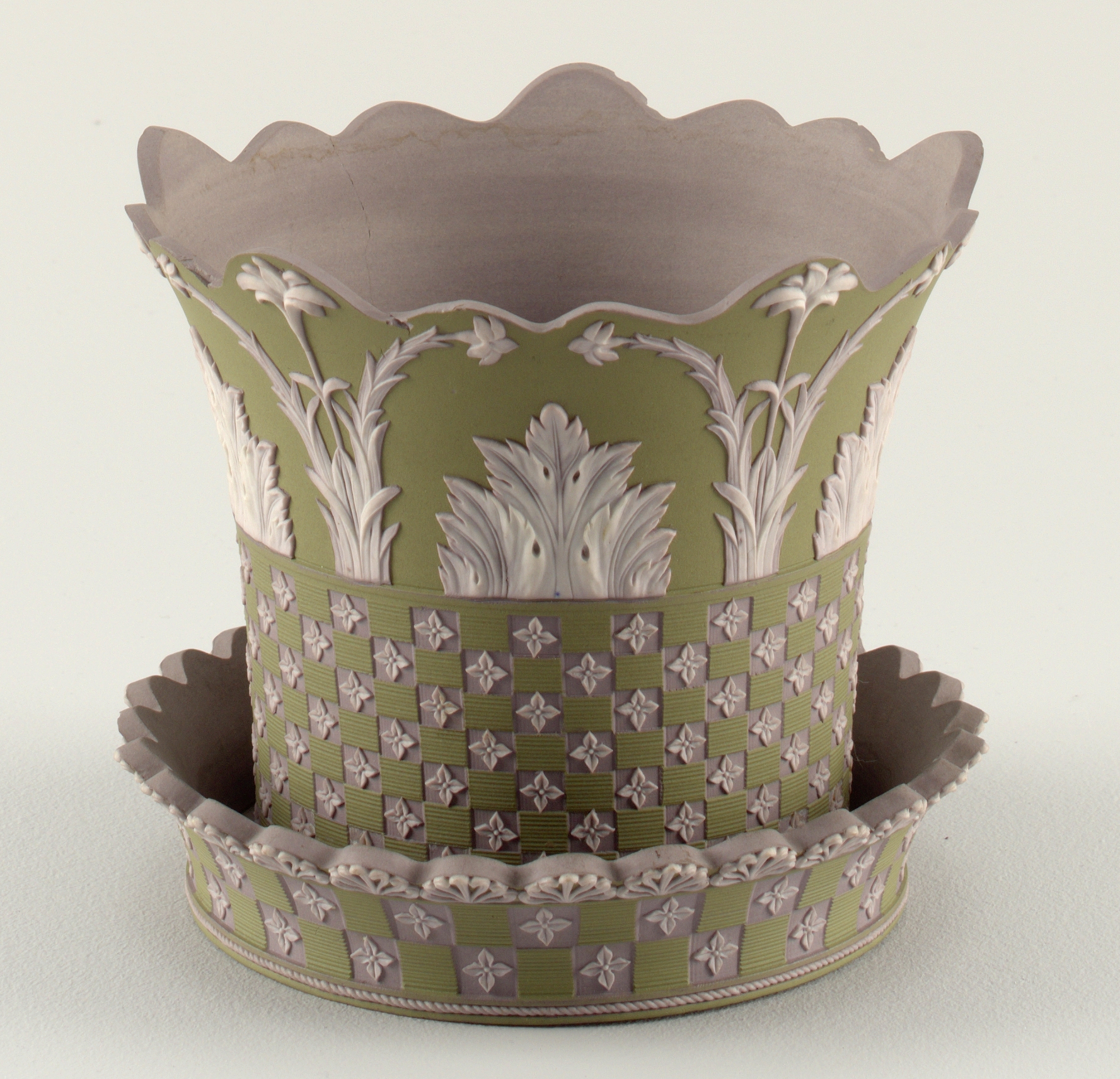
Lilac, white and green jasperware cachepot with saucer, 1785–1790, by William Adams & Sons.

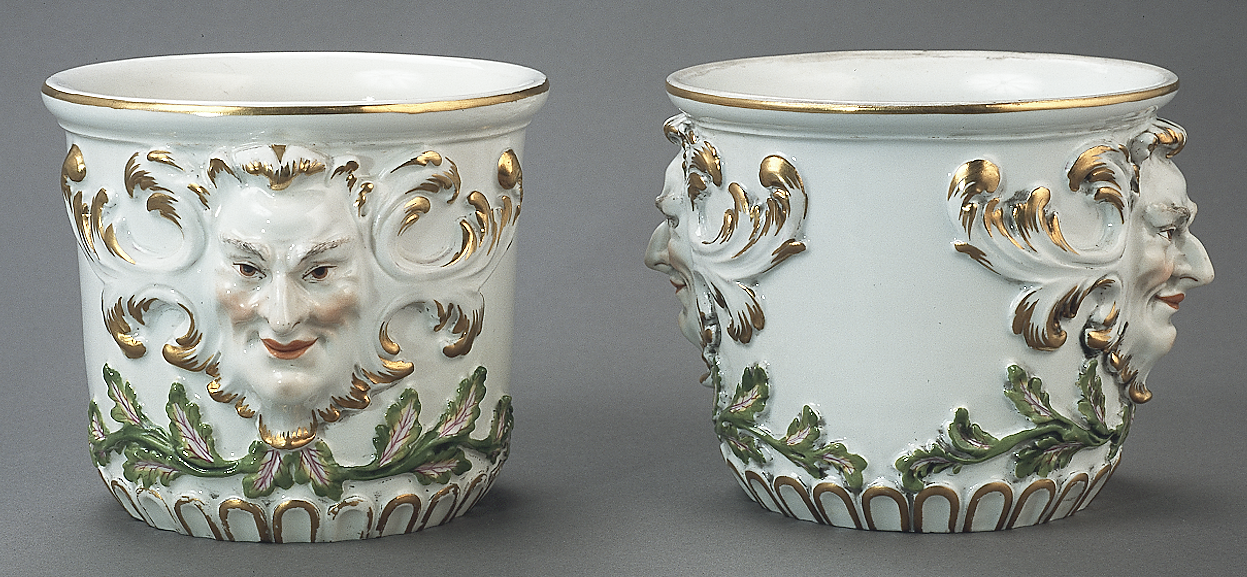
Pair of 19th-century cachepots in Meissen porcelain.

A cachepot (/ˈkæʃpɒt, -poʊ/, French: [kaʃpo]) is a French term for what is usually called in modern English a "planter" or for older examples a jardiniere, namely a decorative container or "overpot" for a plant and its flowerpot, for indoors use, usually with no drainage hole at the bottom, or sometimes with a matching saucer. It is intended to be more attractive than the terracotta (or today, plastic) flowerpot in which the plant grows, and to keep water off furniture surfaces.

Another French term is jardinière; the distinction is it is usually larger, and may sit on the floor, either indoors or outdoors. They are often rectangular, where a cachepot is typically round. A cachepot is meant to be displayed on a tabletop, mantel, or shelf indoors.

In modern English the term is usually found in descriptions of pottery examples.

== Origin ==
The word cachepot is French from the French verb cacher, meaning "to hide". Cachepots are vase-like containers to aesthetically hide a growing pot holding the plant itself to provide greenery indoors.

== Design ==
A cachepot is typically made of glass, ceramic, iron, tin or other impervious material, and is chosen based on its appearance. Cachepots can also be made of raw semi-porous materials such as clay or cement; the resultant "unfinished" look is well-suited for rustic, industrial, and other non-traditional interior decorating schemes. In such cases, it is not uncommon for the pot's surface to be stained or otherwise weatherized to give a more vintage appearance. Critically, however, the pot has no hole at its base for discharging excess water. This protects the underlying surface from developing damage or staining due to exposure to excess water, soil, and drips from the potplant.

However, such a design presents a risk for the plant, whose roots can rot if left immersed in water. This means the cachepot should be drained after watering in situ or the potplant watered separately then replaced after being left to drain.

== Association with Clintons ==
Cachepots have been given as gifts from the former United States president Bill Clinton to foreign visitors. The Clinton gift was a custom-designed Tiffany silver cachepot given to many visiting heads of state.

== See also ==
- Index of gardening articles
