= Organic hydroponics =

Organic hydroponics is a hydroponics culture system based on organic agriculture concepts that does not use synthetic inputs such as fertilizers or pesticides. In organic hydroponics, nutrient solutions are derived from plant and animal material or naturally mined substances. Most studies on the topic have focused on the use of organic fertilizer.

== Benefits ==
There is increased consumer interest in organic hydroponics, as the global organic market is expected to grow nearly 25% from 2017 to 2024. Due to decreased use of nitrate based fertilizers, nitrate levels in organic soil-based crops found to be lower than in conventional crops. Furthermore, beneficial microbes have been found to induce resistance against soil and air-borne diseases, and can outcompete harmful organisms to promote resilient systems.

Organics also present some health benefits. Since soil-based organic agriculture uses less pesticides, it has lower toxic residues than plants grown with inorganic fertilizer by approximately 75%. While there is inconclusive research on whether it is more nutritious than conventional agriculture, a meta analysis of plant nutrition found that soil-grown organic food is higher in antioxidants.

== Challenges ==
Organic hydroponic systems often have lower crop yields relative to conventional hydroponics. A 2001 study found that lettuce grown in organic solution yielded much less and grew at a significantly slower rate than lettuce grown in conventional solution. Furthermore, organic hydroponic systems are prone to large pH fluctuations, with limited input products that can be used to balance them out. In addition, organic hydroponics requires very high amounts of knowledge, experience, and investment compared with conventional agriculture.

Successful use of organic fertilizers can be more difficult in hydroponic systems than in fields, where beneficial microbes in the soil help to break down organic fertilizer into nutrients that are usable by the plant. When grown in soilless substrates, organic fertilizers may not be readily broken down by microbes and can inhibit plant growth.

While the degradation of organic fertilizers in water had previously been difficult, Japanese research has led to the development of a method that uses microorganisms to degrade organic compounds into inorganic nutrients such as nitrate nitrogen, even in an aquatic environment. This microbial cultivation method is called the multiple parallel mineralization. Since the microbial ecosystem formed in the water rapidly degrades organic fertilizers into inorganic nutrients, it is possible to use organic fertilizers in hydroponic cultivation, just as in soil-based cultivation.

== Fertilizers ==
When evaluating the effectiveness of organic fertilizer, it is important to keep in mind the huge difference in effectiveness between different types of fertilizers. Besides differences between types of fertilizers, the mineral content from batch to batch can vary widely due to the organic nature of the sources, and the different crop fertilizer needs. There are a number of promising sources for organic fertilizer.

Vermicompost leachate, or worm compost tea, makes a highly nutritious fertilizer if the food and animal waste used in its production are of high quality. Since it is already liquid, it can be easily added to hydroponic systems. Similarly, a study in Japan had positive results using treated food waste as fertilizer. This study used fish-based soluble fertilizer and corn steep liquor, which are byproducts of existing food production, with success. A study from Thailand used a combination of waste molasses, distillery slop, and sugarcane leaves. After testing different ratios of these mediums, the authors found a ratio that led to growth rates comparable to those of chemical fertilizer.

These methods have the added ecological benefits of being less energy intensive than inorganic fertilizer production, while diverting food waste from landfills, where nutrients are not cycled and greenhouse gases are generated as waste breaks down.

== Organic certification ==
Organic certification of hydroponics has been a heavily contested topic in the agriculture industry. In the United States, which is the only country that allows hydroponic production to be certified "organic," there are no formal guidelines on organic hydroponics. In 2010, the National Organic Standards Board voted decisively against organic certification of hydroponic production. In 2018, an NOSB vote to change the NOSB's 2010 recommendation failed. The USDA refused to implement the 2010 NOSB recommendation, so certification was left to the discretion of third party certifying agents. In 2020 a coalition organic growers and organizations sued the US Department of Agriculture demanding that USDA follow the NOSB recommendation that hydroponic production not be certifiable. The court dismissed the suit on the grounds that this determination is within the USDA's discretion.

Hydroponics and aeroponics are not allowed to be labeled and sold as organic in Canada, as they do not meet the minimum soil requirements. Similarly, beginning 2021 under the revised European Union organic law, hydroponically grown crops cannot be certified organic in the EU as they are not produced in soil-based systems.

In Japan, it has become possible to obtain "Special JAS" (Probioponics JAS) certification for hydroponic cultivation techniques that utilize organic fertilizers. To obtain this certification, the use of natural materials as the nitrogen source is a requirement.

== See also ==
- Organic hydroponic solutions
- Controlled-environment agriculture
- Digeponics
