= Garden window =

A garden window or greenhouse window is a type of fenestration constructed as an exterior projection from a building, providing display space in the window. As the name suggests, small potted plants are often displayed in a garden window.

== See also ==
- Window box
