= Hydrozoning =

Practice of clustering together plants to conserve water

Hydrozoning is the practice of clustering together plants with similar water requirements to conserve water. Grouping plants into hydrozones is an approach to irrigation and garden design where plants with similar water needs are grouped. Hydrozoning makes it possible to customize irrigation schedules for each area’s needs, improving efficiency and avoiding overwatering and underwatering certain plants and grasses.

As you move further away from the water source, your plantings require less water. For example, drought tolerant plants such as sage or cactus would not be planted in a bluegrass lawn, but would be separated, since bluegrass has a higher water requirement.

The principal hydrozone is found in local parks and gathering places, such as urban plazas and spaces around well-used public buildings. Mixing plants with different water needs can result in the over-watering of water-thrifty plants or the under-watering of plants requiring regular moisture.

== See also ==
- Xeriscape
- [Hydrozone]
