= Ring culture =

Method of cultivating tomato plants

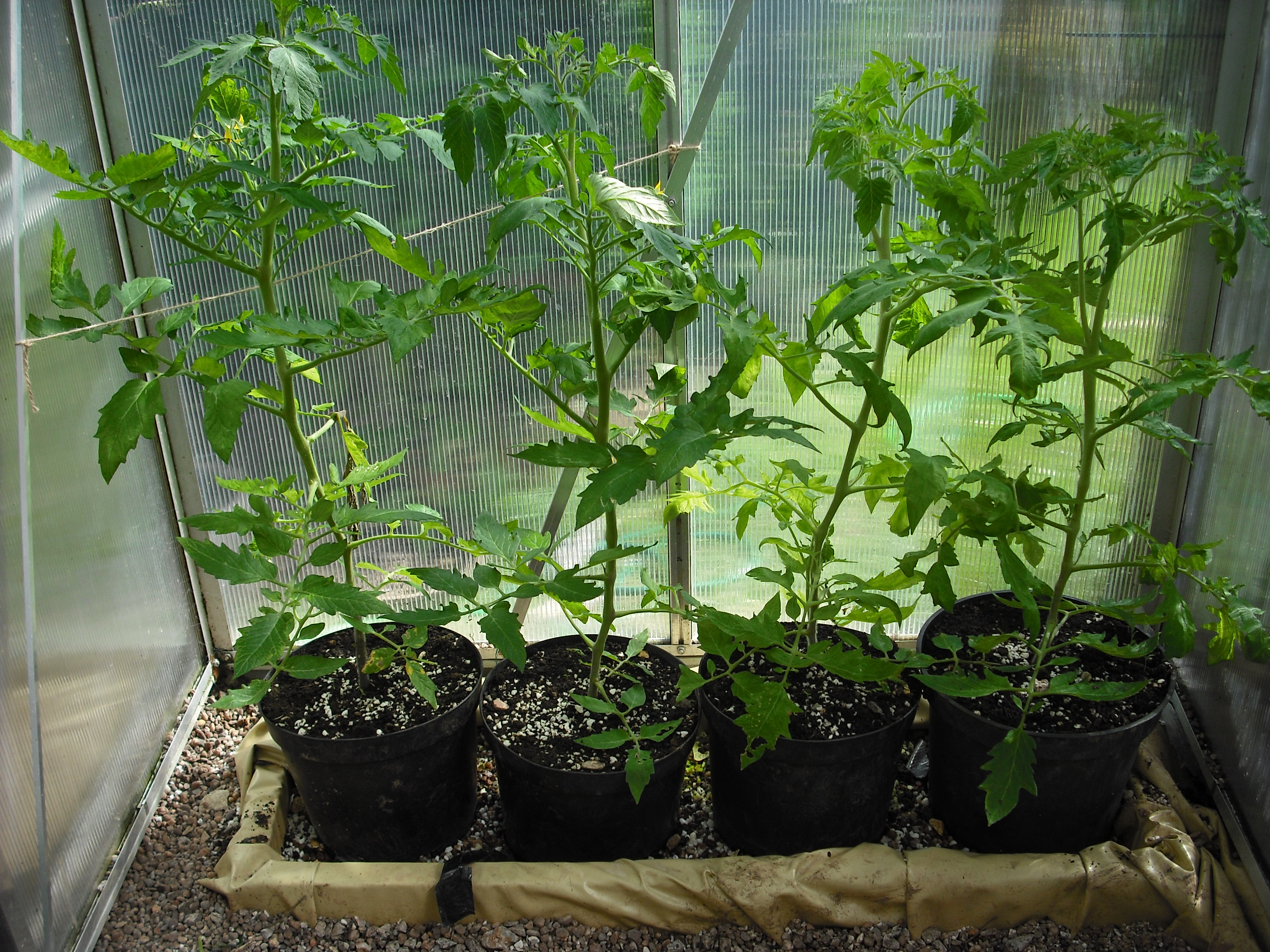
Tomato plants using ring culture. There is water inside the frame with gravel.

Ring culture is a method of cultivating tomato plants. Tomato plants are grown in a bottomless pot, a "ring", and the pot is partially submerged in a tray of water. It is perhaps best described as Two Zone Culture. The gardener aims to have one layer or zone of roots in a container (bottomless pot) and a second layer or zone of roots in some permeable material like gravel, sand or coarse ashes below. Ring culture forces the plants to develop two root systems: one which will absorb the nutrients contained in the soil and another which will absorb the water from the tray. It enables a gardener to grow an excellent group of tomatoes in shallow soil. It is used in greenhouses largely for tomatoes and enables a heavy crop to be grown above, for instance, a gravel path or an ash bed.

== See also ==
- Deep water culture
- Hydroponics
