= Nurse grafting =

Method of plant propagation

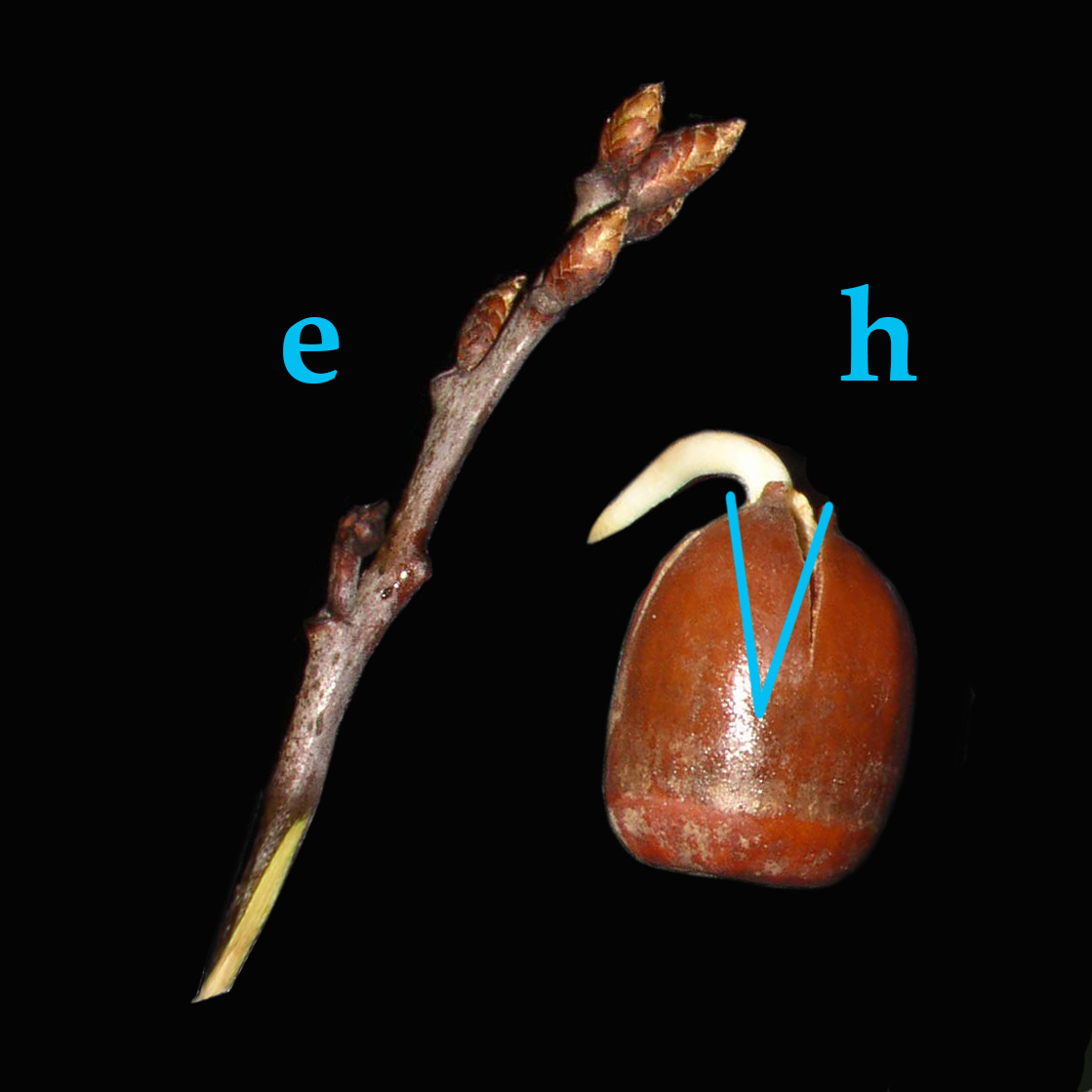
Nurse grafting of Quercus rubra

Nurse grafting is a method of plant propagation that is used for hard-to-root plant material. If a desirable selection cannot be grown from seed (because a seed-grown plant will be genetically different from the parent), it must be propagated asexually (cloned) in order to be genetically identical to the parent. Nurse grafting allows a scion to develop its own roots instead of being grafted to a rootstock.

== Nurse seed grafting ==
A large-seeded woody species, e.g. the chestnut, retains the cotyledons inside the seed coat below ground while the radicle grows downward and the shoot appears aboveground. To make a nurse seed graft, a germinating seed is needed. A knife is used to cut an opening between the petioles of the cotyledons. The scion, taken from dormant wood of the previous season's growth, is cut to a wedge shape at the end and inserted into the cut between the cotyledons, so that the cambium surfaces of each can join. The grafted plant is then set in a rooting medium with the union about 1.5 inch below the surface.

This graft allows the scion to live on the seed's roots long enough to form adventitious roots of its own. This technique is used for camellias, avocados, and chestnuts.

== Nurse root grafting ==
In this technique, a scion is grafted to a piece of root to keep it alive long enough for it to form its own roots. The graft union is planted below the surface of the growing medium, as with the nurse seed method. Once the scion has formed roots of its own, the rootstock can be removed, or it will die off, as will happen in situations when the scion and rootstock are not closely related.

This method works well with apple cultivars, cherries, plums, nectarines, and pears. It is also useful for propagating rare isolated plants that may be unique and should not be moved from the wild. Such a plant can be propagated by taking a small amount of material that will not harm the parent plant by its removal.

Nurse root grafting is the best method for propagating tree peonies. Unlike herbaceous peonies with fleshy roots, which are propagated by division, tree peonies have woody stems and extensive root systems that are impractical for division. Their woody stems have few stored reserves and stem cuttings fail before roots are produced. The problem of keeping the scion alive long enough to produce roots (generally a year) is solved by grafting a tree peony shoot on an herbaceous peony root section; the section of root sustains the scion with its ample stored energy. (In contrast, Itoh peony hybrids, which are crosses between herbaceous and tree peonies, are best propagated by stem cuttings, which root easily.)

The basic process for nurse-root grafting of peonies is as follows:

1. Grafting should be done in late summer or early fall, when the foliage of herbaceous peonies begins to change color and tree peony stems have matured. Most cultivars of P. lactiflora can be used to supply roots.
2. Take root sections 0.75in (2 cm) in diameter and 6in to 8in (15–20 cm) long. It is important to maintain the orientation of each root (the top is closest to the crown of the plant). Rinse clean and soak in dilute bleach solution (1:10) to sterilize.
3. Take stem cuttings from a tree peony, up to 6in long, with 2-3 dormant buds, and soak in dilute bleach solution to sterilize.
4. Prepare a side wedge graft: With a utility (single edge razor) blade, cut a wedge in one side of the top of the root section. (The root is much thicker than the scion.) At the end of the scion, make two oblique cuts to form a prow shape corresponding to the wedge shape in the root section. When the root and scion are joined and aligned, the green cambium layer of the scion must be in contact with the cut surface of the root, with no gaps.
5. Hold the two sections together with a rubber band, then seal the whole area with grafting tape.
6. Allow the union to begin to callous before planting. Label the graft and place in a sealed plastic bag with a damp tissue around the root. Keep it in a warm place for 3 to 4 weeks. Keep the root oriented downward; hanging the bag will help with this. The temperature should be around 68 degrees F (20 degrees C).
7. Plant out the graft where it can be left undisturbed for 2 years, with the graft union 4in – 6in below the surface of the soil.
8. When root development on the scion has taken place, which may be the following autumn, remove the rubber band.
9. After a second season of growth, the plant should be lifted and the roots inspected. If the scion has formed its own roots, the nurse root must be removed. The plant can now be placed in its permanent location.
