= Collective landscape =

Term for landscape design and planning

The term collective landscape was introduced to landscape design and landscape planning by Sir Geoffrey Jellicoe.

He wrote, on the dust jacket of his book:

The landscape of man, that "The world is moving into a phase when landscape design may well be recognized as the most comprehensive of the arts. Man creates around him an environment that is a projection into nature of his abstract ideas. It is only in the present century that the collective landscape has emerged as a social necessity. We are promoting a landscape art on a scale never conceived of in history."

== Definitions ==
It appears that the term was inspired by Carl Jung's use of the term collective unconscious. Jellicoe admired Jung, but the use of 'collective landscape' in the above quotation has something in common with its use in collectivism. Unlike the terms public park and national park, the term collective landscape is a psychological construct and an abstract concept.

'Collective landscape' is therefore best understood as a landscape which:

- exists in the collective unconscious
- like other public goods, does not belong to any individual

== Applications ==
In American contemporary landscape architecture the term 'collective landscape' is used to mean 'landscape which matters to the community' as in the following quotation from the Smokey Mountain News for the week of 10/12/05:

The struggle to preserve a collective landscape heritage has been fought and won by the Cherokee once in the past, but is now at risk again.

== See also ==
- Designed landscape
- Landscape detailing
