= Jardiniere =

Type of flower pot

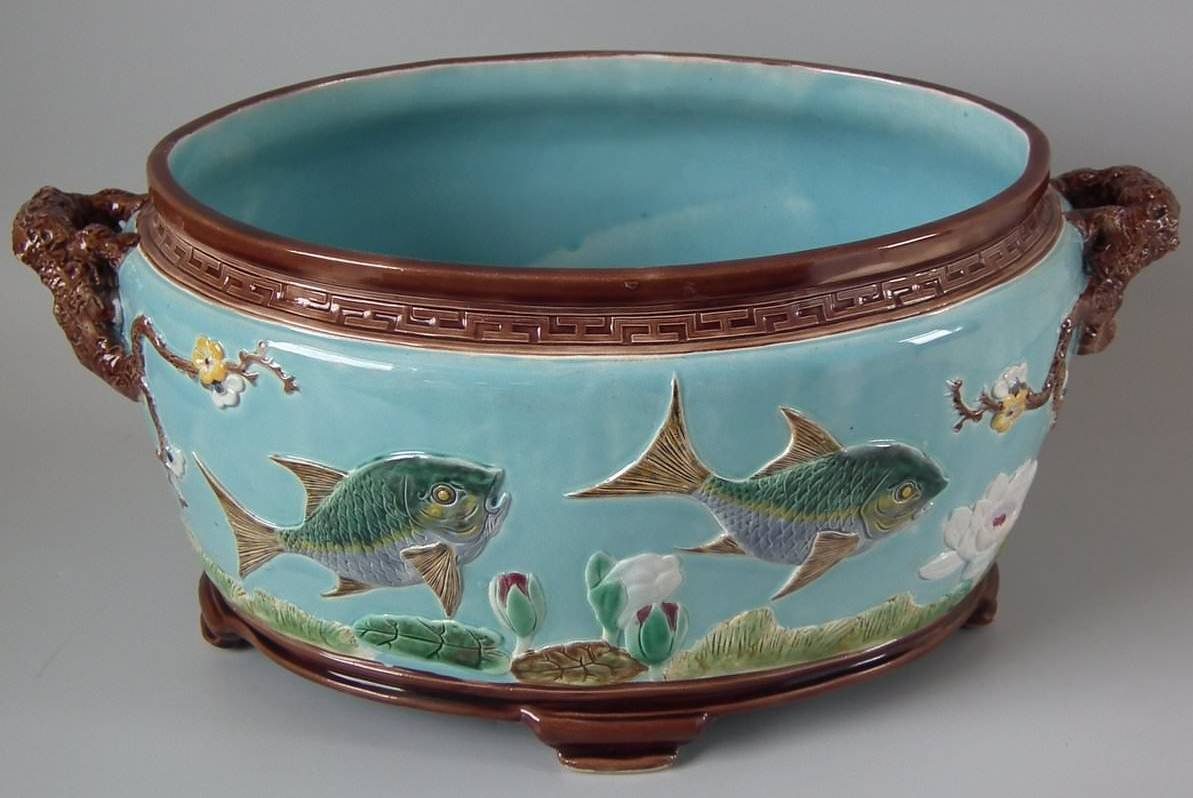
English Victorian majolica jardinière

Jardinière is a French word, from the feminine form of "gardener". In English it means a decorative flower box or "planter", a receptacle (usually a ceramic pot or urn) or a stand upon which, or into which, plants (often in pots) may be placed, usually indoors. The French themselves mostly refer to tabletop "planter" versions of such receptacles as cachepots ("hide-pots"). The French tend to use jardinière for larger outdoor containers for plants, and for raised beds in gardens in some sort of isolated frame, such as a stone wall, especially growing vegetables and herbs.

In the sense in English jardinières, often without the accent, are most often made in pottery, but may be in metal, glass, plastic or wood. They may be supplied with liners.

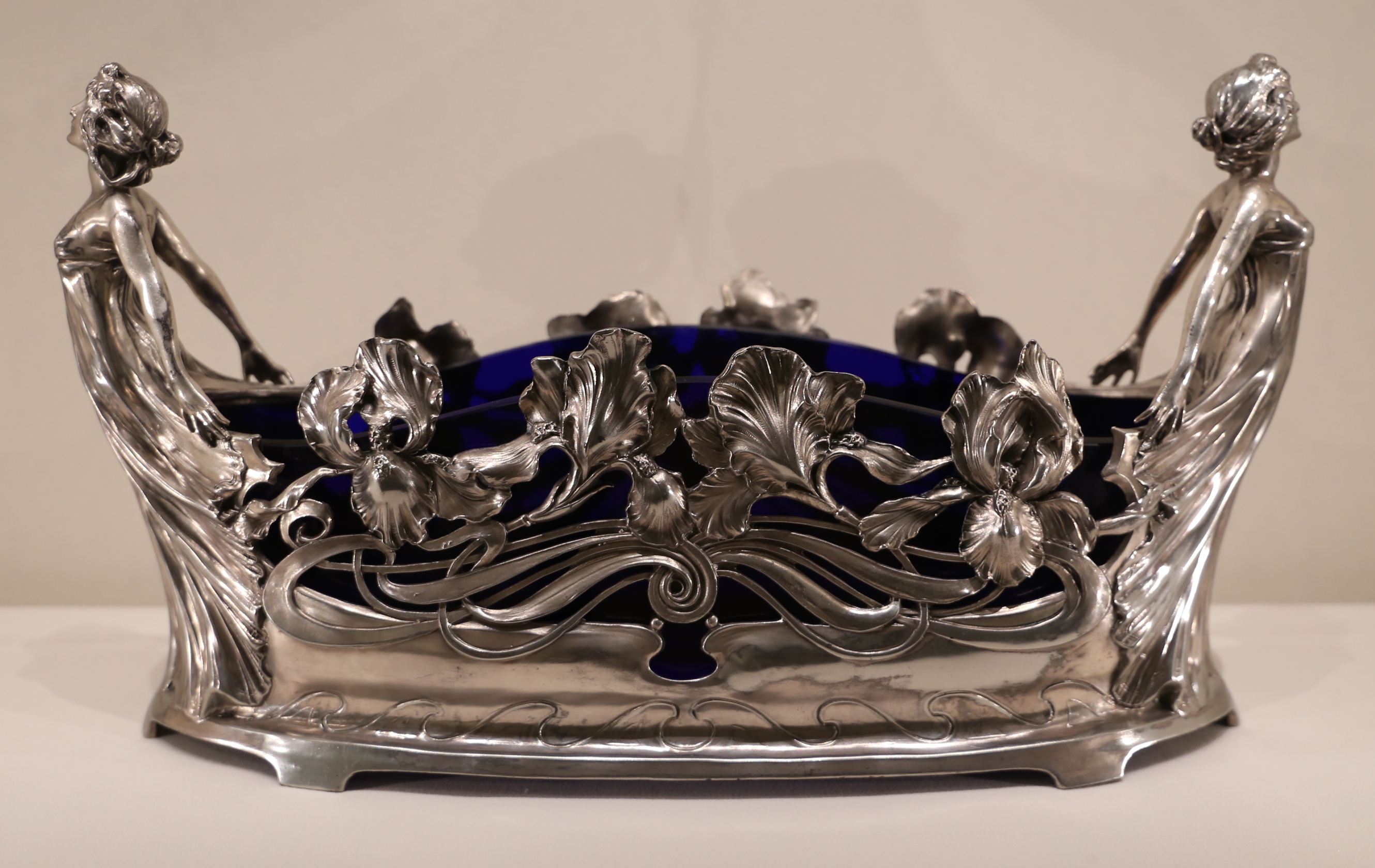
Art Nouveau jardinière in pewter metal, with a glass liner, Vienna, 1900

In cookery, another French meaning, a dish that is cooked or served with a mixture of spring vegetables, such as peas, carrots, and green beans, is also used.

The horticulturist Gertrude Jekyll wrote:

"There are some English words which have no equivalent in French, but then there are a great many more French words ... for which we have no English. One of these is jardinière. Even in French it does not quite rightly express its meaning, because the obvious meaning of jardinière is female gardener, whereas what we understand by it ... is a receptacle for holding pot-plants."

In French, it is also a common name for the golden ground beetle, which attacks pests in kitchen gardens.

== Gallery ==
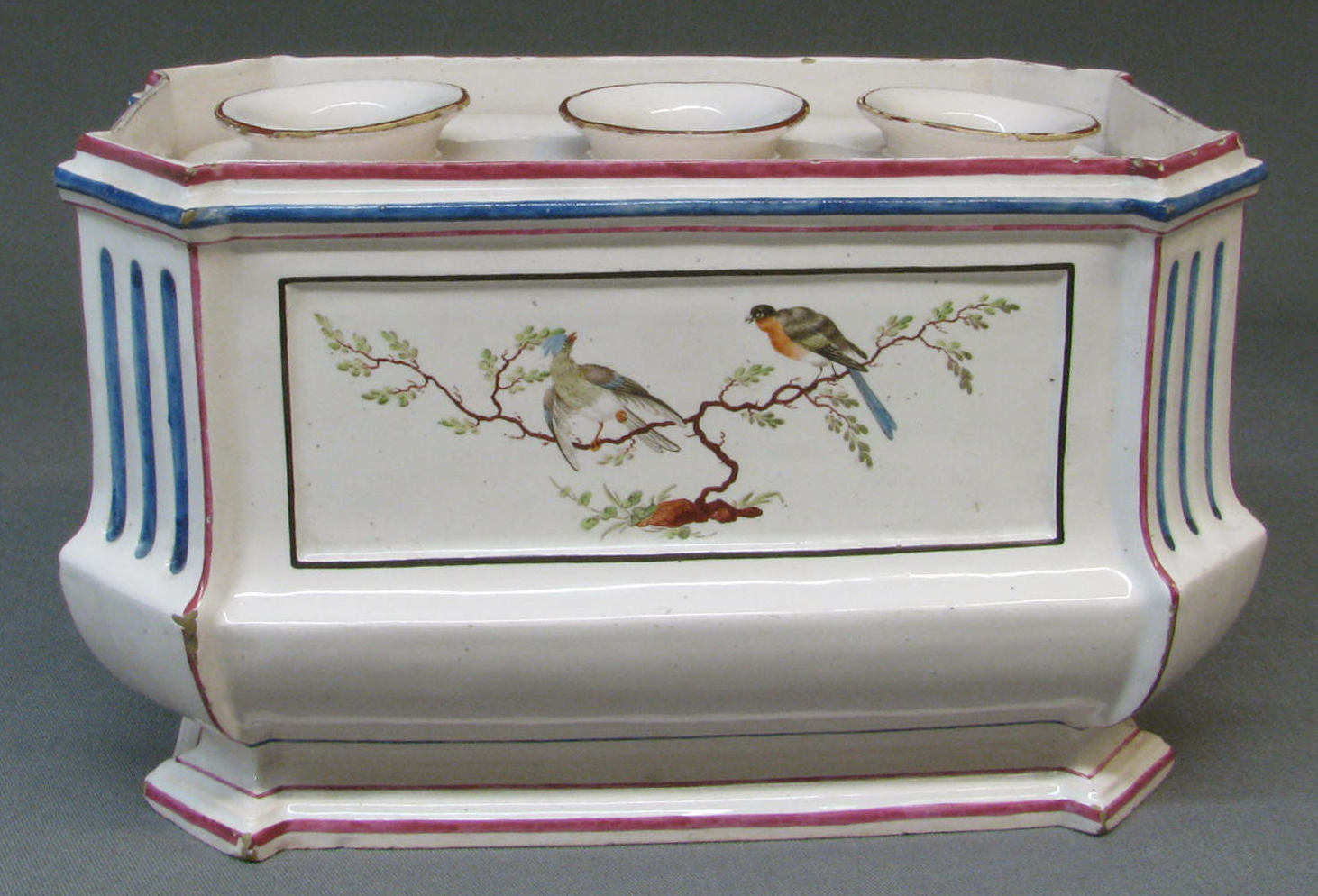
French faience, c. 1750, with three pots inside

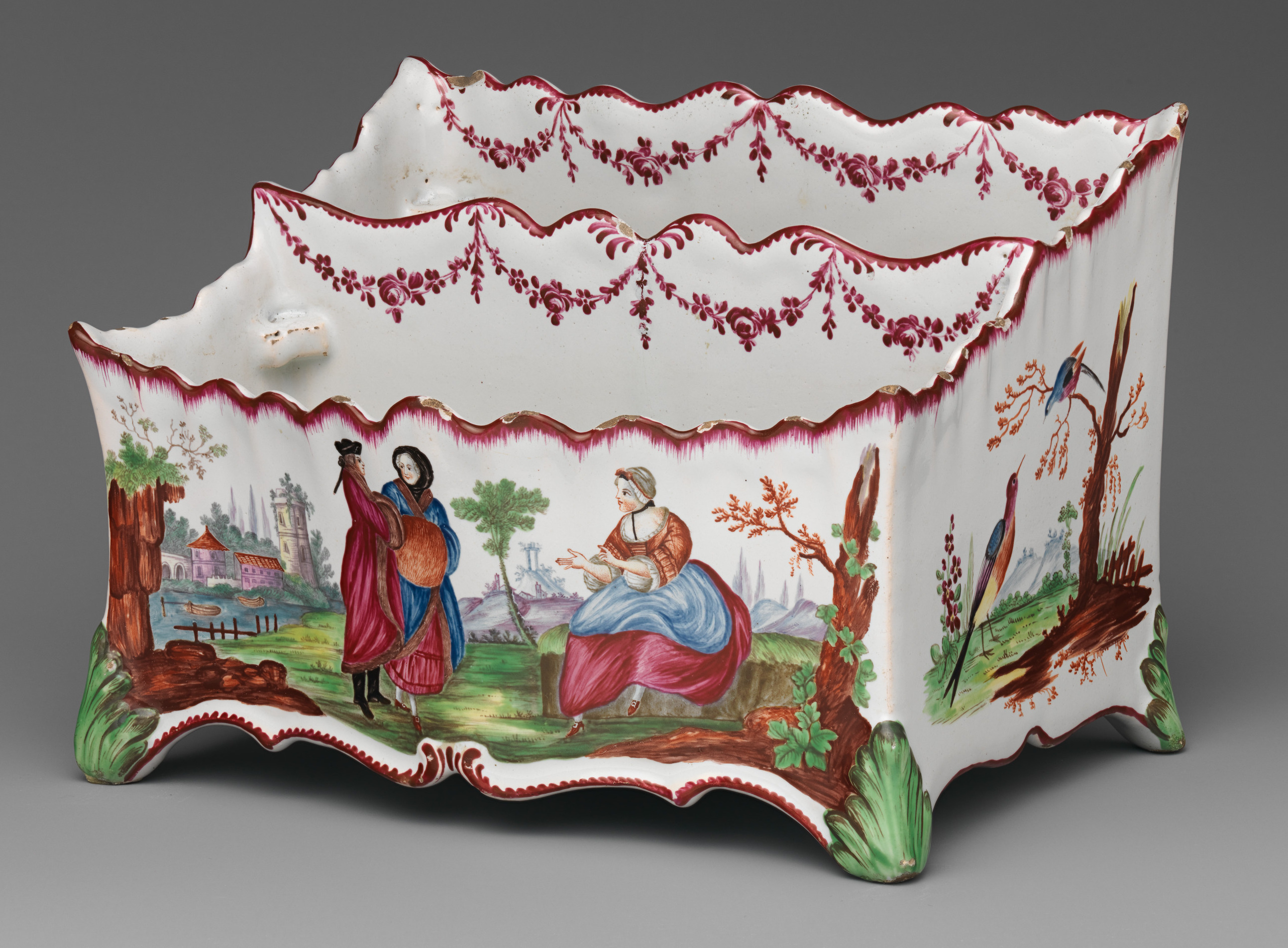
French faience, c. 1770, with two compartments. Probably used for bulbs, with soil placed directly in it

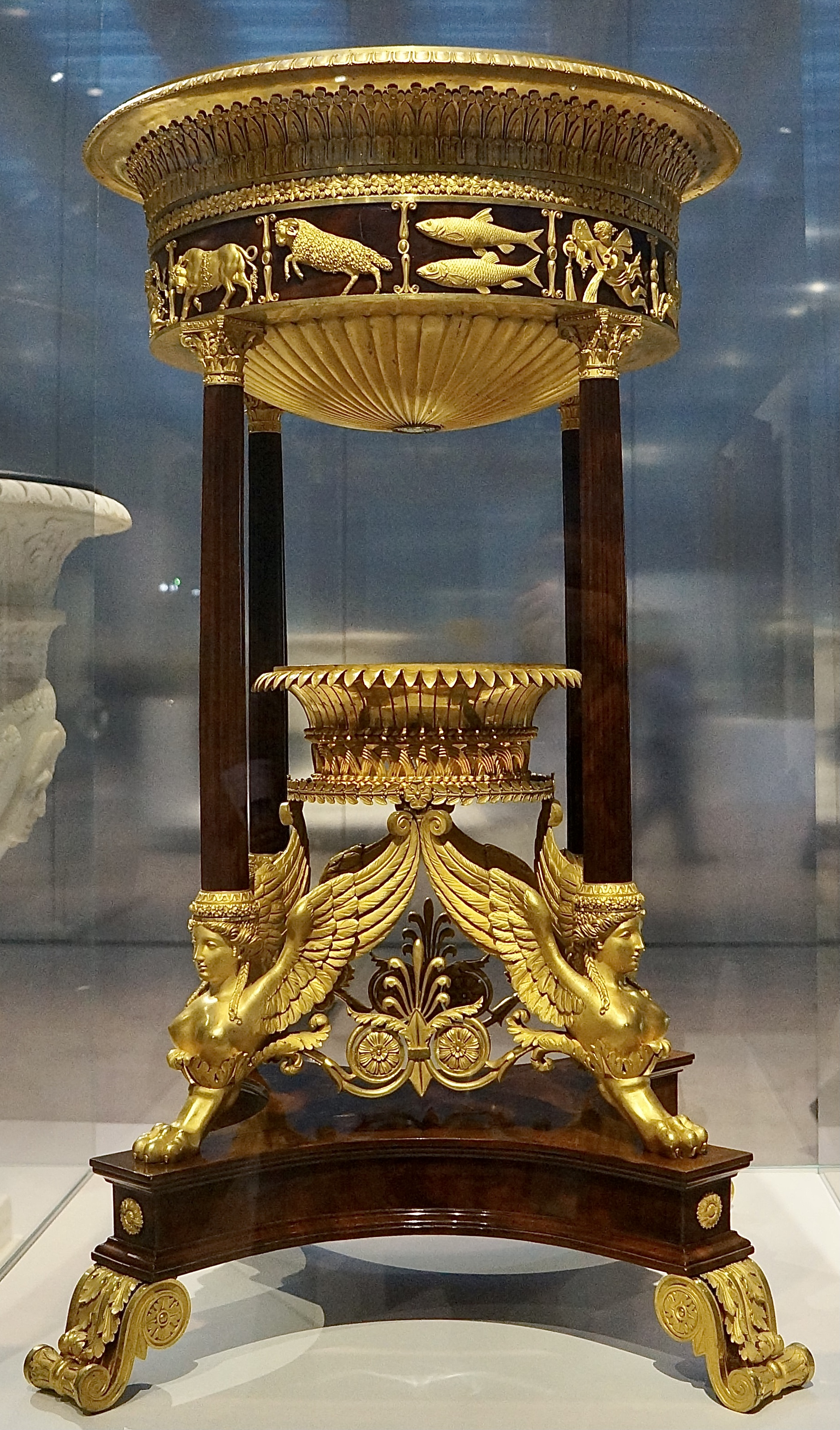
Empire Style, on stand, Louvre

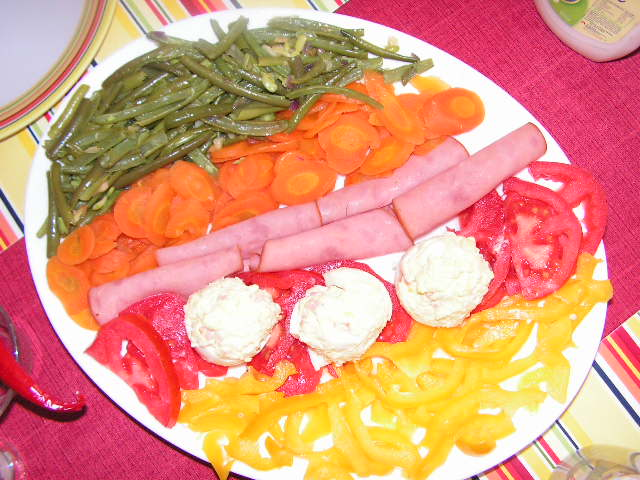
A jardinière dish

== See also ==
- List of English words of French origin
- Container garden
- Potting soil
