= Root trainer =

Aid to the cultivation of young plants and trees

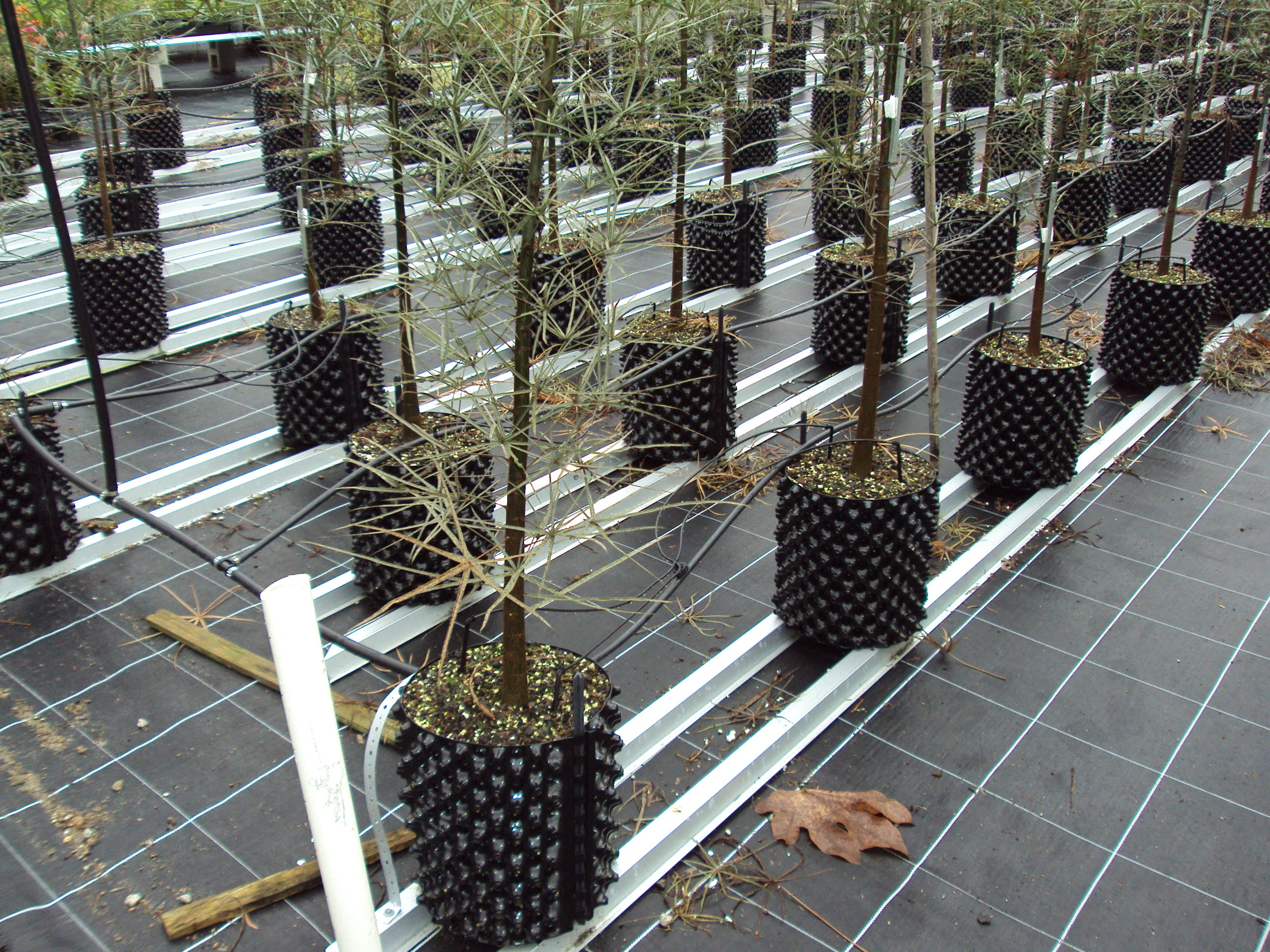
Root trainer pots

Many pot designs train the roots. One example is a truncated plastic cone in which a seedling is planted. There is a drainage hole at the bottom and the main tap root tends to grow towards this.

What this achieves is to encourage the roots to grow a denser system of root hairs. How it does this is to have the pots designed so as to air prune the roots. The advantage is when the plant is planted into its home environment it has a stronger root base to start with.

When polythene bags are used instead, this root tends to go through the bag into the ground and is then broken off when the tree is moved for planting. The other roots are insufficiently developed to cope with the shock caused by this and so the tree's chances of survival are reduced. The root trainer is mounted in a stand above ground so that, when the tap root emerges, it is dried by the air. This air pruning causes the root inside the pot to thicken with stored carbohydrates that support vigorous root growth when the plant is put in the ground. The other lateral roots of the plant grow to compensate for this—so a stronger root ball forms, which improves the sapling's chances.

When raising multiple seedlings, the root trainers are commonly placed in trays or racks. The size of each trainer depends upon the species but, for broad-leaved trees, the capacity is about a cup. Vertical ribs inside the trainer are positioned to train the roots to grow downwards and so prevent root spiralling.

== History ==
Owing to numerous problems (stability, restricted growth, etc.), the issue of root circling in root pruning containers had to be addressed. Some, even today, promote cutting, slicing, or shaving root systems of plants grown in conventional containers prior to planting to stop circling. However, this is only partially effective and, like mechanical field pruning, it creates open wounds, allowing pathogens an opportunity to attack.

Most understood the root system is extremely important to its overall performance once planted out and have tried changing container designs. One of the first designs was simply using an open-bottomed, waxed cardboard milk carton container. The results were promising. When the taproot eventually reached the base, it would become exposed to air, dehydrate and die at the tip, stimulating roots to branch behind this point, much like pruning a hedge. However, all roots were forced downward so there was still plenty of room for improvement to gain side branching.

A container with vertical slots on the side was tested. Surprisingly, the results were poor. Water loss was high and only occasionally would roots find a slot and branch. The majority continued to circle.

Interior ribs were added to deflect roots, but these containers would not stack. Polybags had been tested and root branching occurred where root were trapped in the gusseted bottom. These proved difficult to fill and handle, and still no side branching. The Stairstep container was a design that trapped root tips to force branching and yet could be stacked. However, production costs made this container difficult to manufacture.

One container designer tried “root suffocation pruning.” When a root grows into a reservoir of water at the bottom, it is suffocated. The death of the root tip causes root branching but as with physically cutting roots, pathogens are a problem.

Some containers even use chemicals to cause root branching. Some herbicides have been uses as well as copper, but copper creates toxicity issues for the plant.

Porous fabric containers have been tried but have high water loss and salt accumulation. Plus, these containers are still passive with root pruning, relying on roots eventually finding an opening.

The evolution of root pruning containers continues and currently rests in three types.

1. Knit fabric inground containers work well. Roots grow through specifically sized holes but are girdled and cannot expand. The swelling of the root both inside and outside of the girdled point causes branching within the container, yet greatly minimized any open wounds at harvest.

2. Another high-tech fabric container is used above ground. A white laminate (to prevent the lethal temperatures of black containers exposed to sun) coats the outside of a fuzzy, root-tip-trapping interior that stops root circling. When growth of the root tip is inhibited, branching occurs.

3. Finally, millions of trees are grown yearly using the latest design of containers for air-root-pruning. There are several types on the market, but the original root pruning container system uses a design of ribs, ledges, and holes to actively direct roots to openings. These containers range from propagation sizes of a few cubic inches to hundreds of gallons. With timely shifts, the root pruning momentum can be continued throughout production to equip plants with a root system that ultimately gives the best chance to be securely anchored and succeed in the final planting.
