= Plant LED incubator =

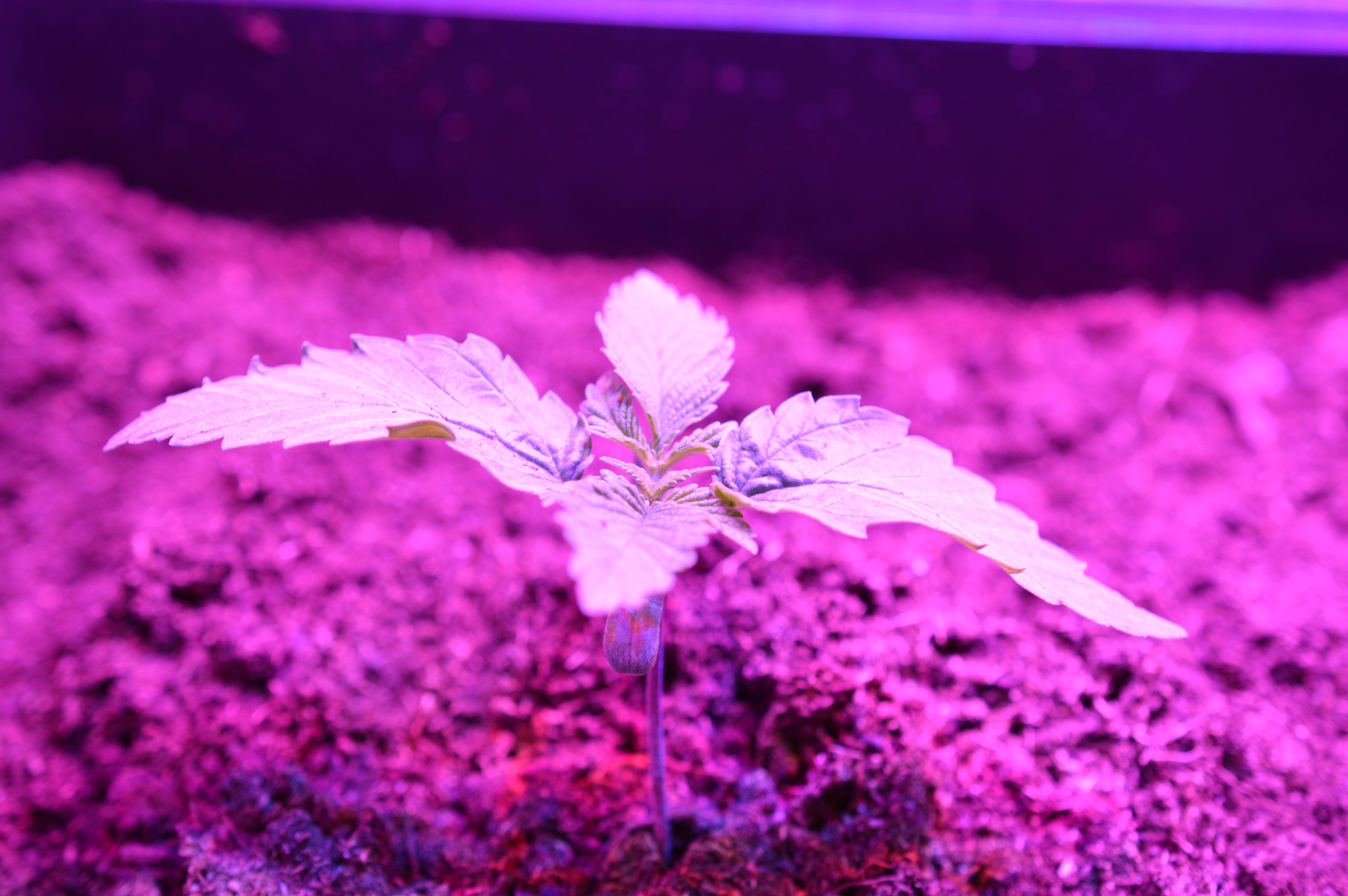
Cannabis seedling in an LED incubator

A plant LED incubator is a chamber which can automatically control the environment of the plant. It can control the temperature, moisture, and especially light regime of the plant based on light emitting diodes (LEDs). LEDs have efficient electric lighting with desired wavelengths (Red+Blue) which support greenhouse production in a minimum time and with high quality and quantity. As LEDs are cool it helps plants to be placed as close as possible to light sources without overheating or scorching. This saves space for intense cultivation. It could provide the opportunity of greenhouse-produced fruits and vegetable to be available for the market more quickly and less expensively due to the effect of LED lighting on earliness, compactness and quality of products.

Incandescent and fluorescent lamps currently available for lighting greenhouse, phytotrones and plant incubators emit color bands that may cause unwanted stem elongation and low quality in plant species, are electrically inefficient, short-lived, and particularly not eco-friendly for having hazardous waste disposal issues. On the other side, high-pressure sodium (HPS) discharge lamps have been well established in the greenhouses for their sufficient light intensities which support transplants and seedlings growth and development. Unfortunately, they have also many drawbacks. They are intensely hot and scorch nearby plant tissues, consume high electrical energy and as fluorescent lamps do not emit the exact required light wavelengths for optimum plant growth

== Scientific experiments ==
A large number of plant species have been assessed in greenhouse trials to make sure plants have higher quality in biomass and biochemical ingredients even higher or comparable with field conditions. Plant performance of mint, basil, lentil, lettuce, cabbage, parsley, carrot and… were measured by assessing health and vigor of plants and success in promoting growth. Promoting in profuse flowering of select ornamentals including primula, marigold, stock and…… were also noticed. Experiments unraveled surprising performance and production of vegetables and ornamental plants under LED light sources.

== See also ==
- Grow box
