= Garden sanctuary =

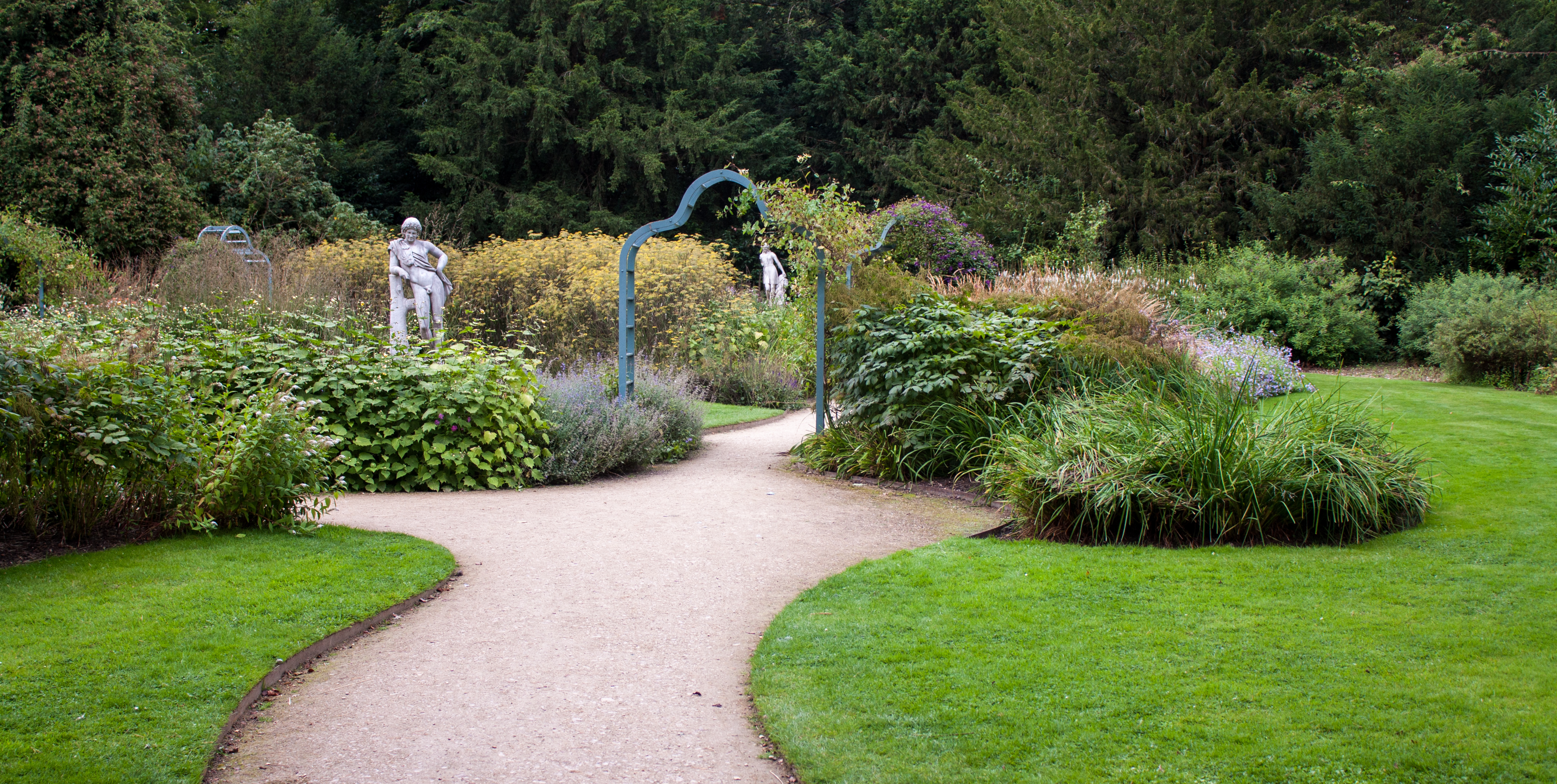
Secret Garden, Cliveden, August 2012.

Garden sanctuary is a concept that follows on from the popular understanding of the power of a private garden to heal therapeutically, first popularized by The Secret Garden, the 1911 novel by Frances Hodgson Burnett. Otherwise, it or "secret garden" may refer to a garden room, a part of a garden enclosed or segregated in some way to form a room-like space.

== See also ==
Hortus conclusus
