= Upside-down gardening =

Hanging vegetable garden technique

Upside-down gardening is a kitchen garden technique where the vegetable garden uses suspended soil and seedlings to stop pests and blight, and eliminate the typical gardening tasks of tilling, weeding, and staking plants. The vegetable growing yield is only marginally affected. Kathi (Lael) Morris was the first known to grow tomatoes and peppers this way, starting in 1998. Since then, the concept gained tremendous popularity. Ms. Morris grew mostly heirloom varieties, researching over a span of 11 years, which varieties were compact enough to produce fruit in abundance with little or no breakage of the stems.

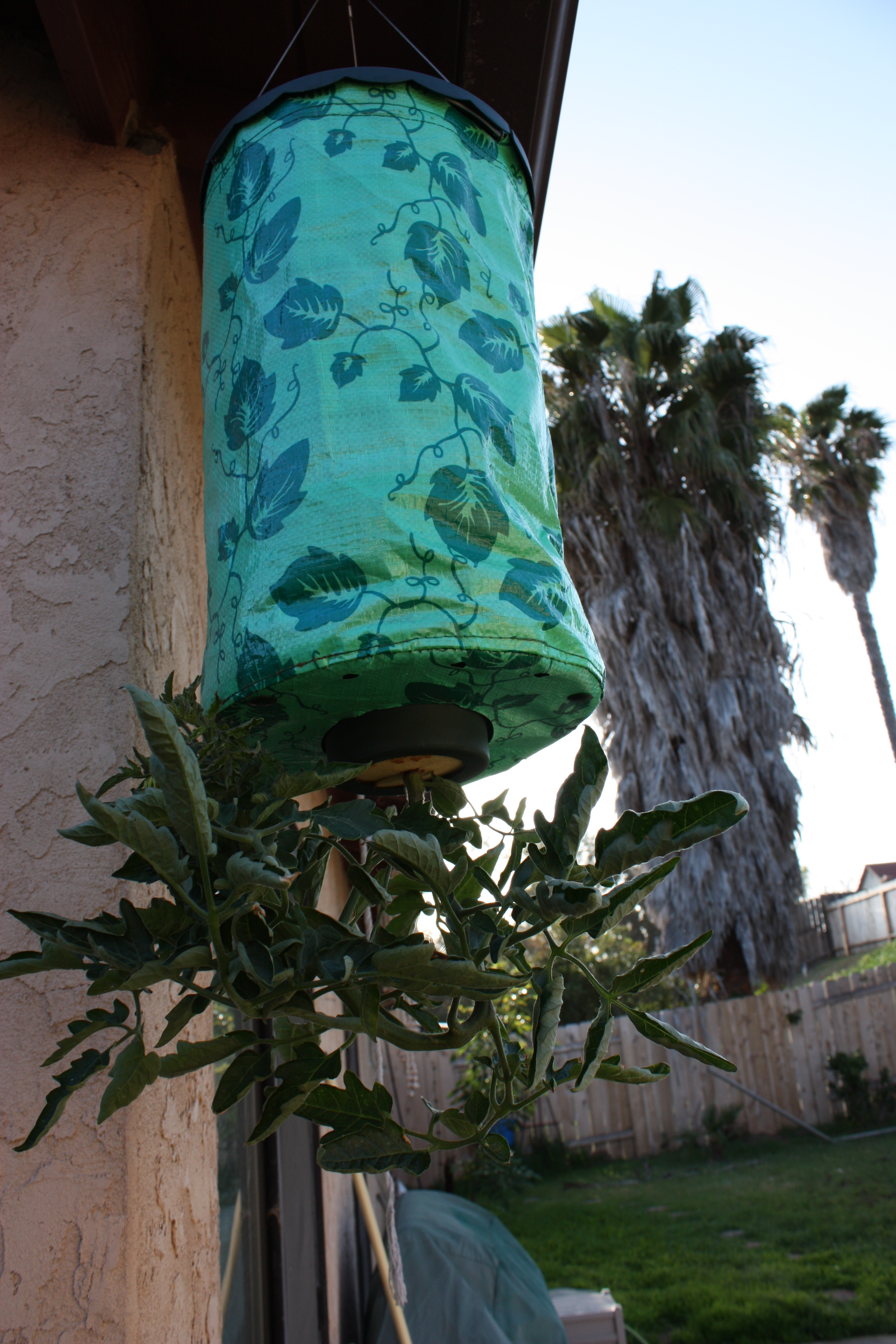
Tomato plant growing upside-down.

== Advantages over normal gardening ==
Since upside-down gardens take up far less room than the traditional in-ground type, upside-down ones are more useful in urban areas.

== Suitable plantings ==
Larger vegetables such as bell peppers or large tomatoes tend to break the vine; smaller peppers such as cayenne peppers and tabasco pepper have lower weight and thus gravity does not stress the vine to breakage. Other potential upside-down gardening vegetables include: cucumbers, eggplants, and beans.

The top side may also be used. On the top side of upside-down planters, lettuce, radishes and cress may be grown, and herbs or flowers such as marigolds can absorb sunlight to decrease desiccation of the planter; that is, preventing drying out. Unsuited are lettuce, peas and carrots as they do not generally do well, grown upside-down.

There are some commercial products that help with upside-down gardening, including the Topsy Turvy; and one can find instructions on how to construct them at home.

== See also ==
- Garden design
- Vegetable growing
- Organic gardening
