= Kirpi =

Small traditional hand weeding tool

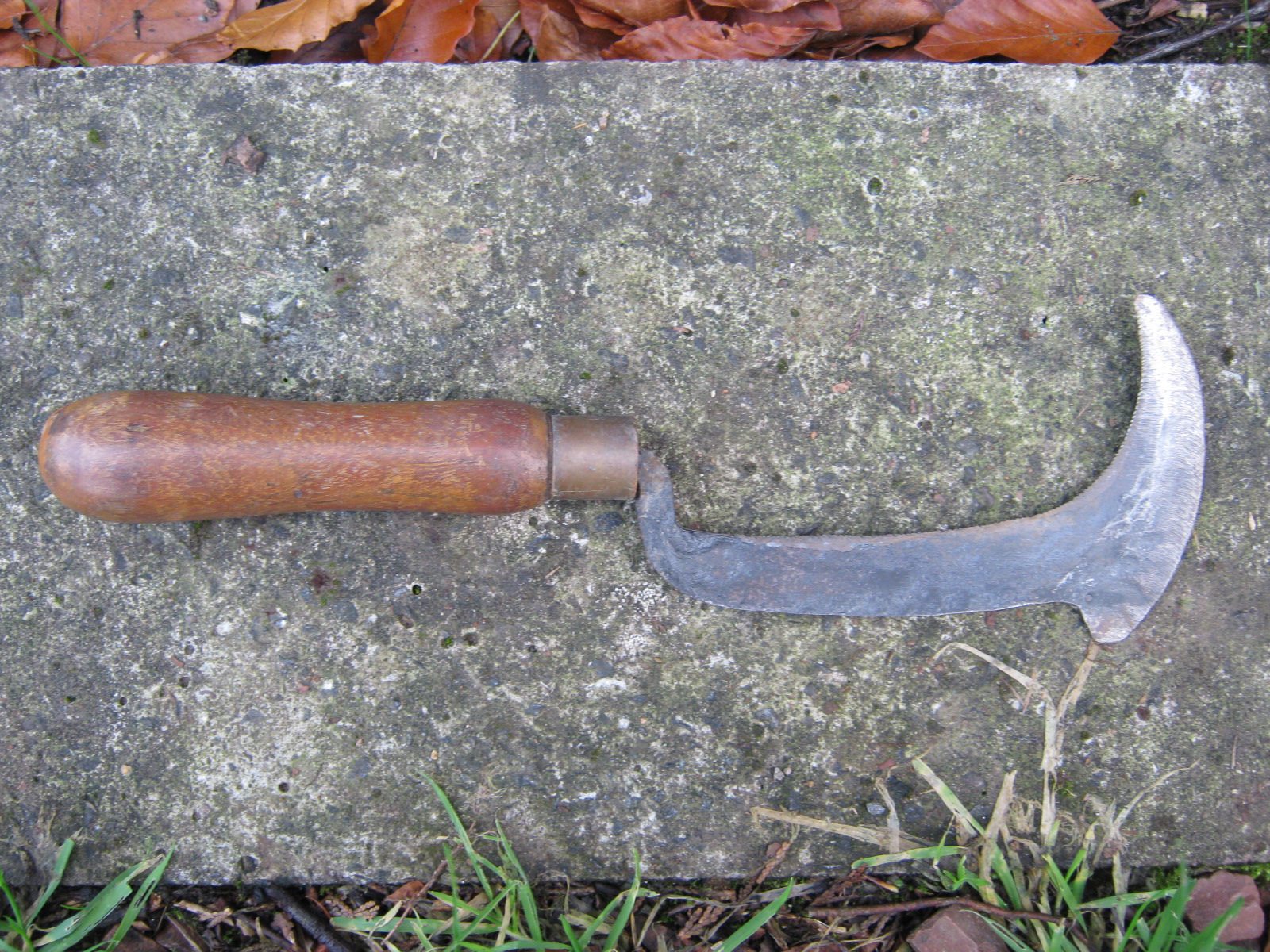

The kirpi is a small traditional hand weeding tool. It evolved in India as a multi-purpose gardening implement. The tool has a wooden handle and a curved blade. The cutting edge on the outside curve of the blade can be used for hand hoeing, while the serrated inside edge cuts through dead vegetation or tough roots. The pointed tip can be used for raking out deep roots.
