= Linear aeration =

Linear aeration is an aeration process that allows water to penetrate the soil and to be retained in the proper amounts. Additionally, it can also add organic nutrition and soil softeners (such as humus, topsoil, compost, sand or clay) if necessary.

== Gardens ==
In the process of linear aeration, organic amendments are applied directly to the soil surface during fallow periods between planting cycles. Subsequently, grooves are mechanically introduced into the soil profile to facilitate the infiltration of these amendments. The grooves are then restored within the same operation, ensuring minimal disturbance to the soil structure and optimizing the integration of organic matter into the root zone.

== Lawns ==
Linear aeration can help to alleviate excessive water in lawn areas. First, necessary organic matter is added on top of the turf, and then grooves are cut into the turf to allow soil additives to penetrate. Finally, the grooves are recovered in the same passage.

== Benefits of linear aeration ==
=== Gardens ===
- Promotes stronger and deeper root development for plant health and drought tolerance.
- Permits proper distribution of soil amendments and additives.
- Allows organic nutrition absorption.

=== Lawns ===
- Alleviates soil compaction in heavily traveled areas.
- Can provide smoother lawn surfaces.
- Reduces disruption of actual turf surface compared to coring or plugs aeration.
- Causes minimal interruption of use of athletic fields.

== See also ==
- Soil improvers index
