= Daisy grubber =

Garden tool

A daisy grubber is a garden tool that is used to pull out roots. It is effective because it can pull out deep roots yet cause little or no disturbance to the surrounding soil.
