= Microbudding =

Grafting technique used in growing citrus trees

Micro-budding is a grafting technique used in the development of citrus trees. Like traditional grafting, there is a combination the hardy characteristics of a rootstock with the desired fruit of the budded region; however, micro-budding is done at a younger age, and because of apical hormonal dominance, the resulting citrus trees grow faster and bear fruit at an earlier stage (2 years) than traditional T-budded grafted trees (5 years to fruit). It was developed in 1997 by Dr. Mani Skaria, a citrus scientist (retired) from the Texas A&M University - Kingsville Citrus Center.

Cultivar varieties utilized for micro-budding are Meyer lemon, Eureka lemon, variegated pink lemon, Persian lime, Kaffir lime, Australian Finger lime, Mandarins, Rio Red grapefruit, Calamondin, and Kumquat trees.

Micro-budding is used in commercial citrus groves. Because of the smaller sizes of the trees, they are utilized in high-density planting, reducing the land costs to growers, but producing a higher output of citrus fruit per acre. Micro-budding may be used as a tool against the citrus greening disease, Huonglongbing, a significant challenge to the citrus industry.
