= Slow gardening =

Gardening philosophy prioritising a slow pace

Slow gardening is a philosophical approach to gardening which encourages participants to savor everything they do, using all the senses, through all seasons, regardless of garden type of style. Slow gardening applies equally to people growing vegetables, herbs, flowers, and fruits, as well as those who tend to their own lawn, or have an intense garden hobby such as topiary, bonsai or plant hybridizing. It is intended to promote self-awareness, personal responsibility, and environmental stewardship.

== Concept ==
Slow gardening was started by American horticulturist and garden author Felder Rushing, who was inspired by the Slow Food organization.

The basic tenets of slow gardening are rooted in the Gestalt approach. A major goal of all slow movements is for adherents to become aware of what and how they are doing something while valuing how it affects the whole. The slow gardening concept:

- uses an experiential, hands-on approach to gardening
- takes into account the whole garden (or gardener – body, mind and spirit)
- assesses what is happening in the present (the here-and-now)
- emphasizes self-awareness
- encourages personal (garden) responsibility
- acknowledges the integrity, sensitivity, and creativity of the gardener
- recognizes that the gardener is central to the gardening process.
