= Carpellody =

Carpellody is a plant disorder that results in misshapen fruits caused by abnormal development of the ovule-bearing part of the flower in angiosperms. It is commonly called "cat face" and is specific to papayas. Some fruits resemble female fruits, but the disorder can cause severely deformed fruits with deep longitudinal ridges. Fruits are generally more rounded and are unmarketable because of their small size, and poor eye appeal.

== Causes ==
Carpellodic fruits may be caused by low night temperatures combined with high moisture and high nitrogen levels. These factors may be what cause the stamens to develop abnormally and develop into carpel-like fleshy structures and cause the resulting deformed fruit.

== See also ==
- Phyllody
