= Flower frog =

Flower arranging device

A flower frog is a device used to help arrange flowers.

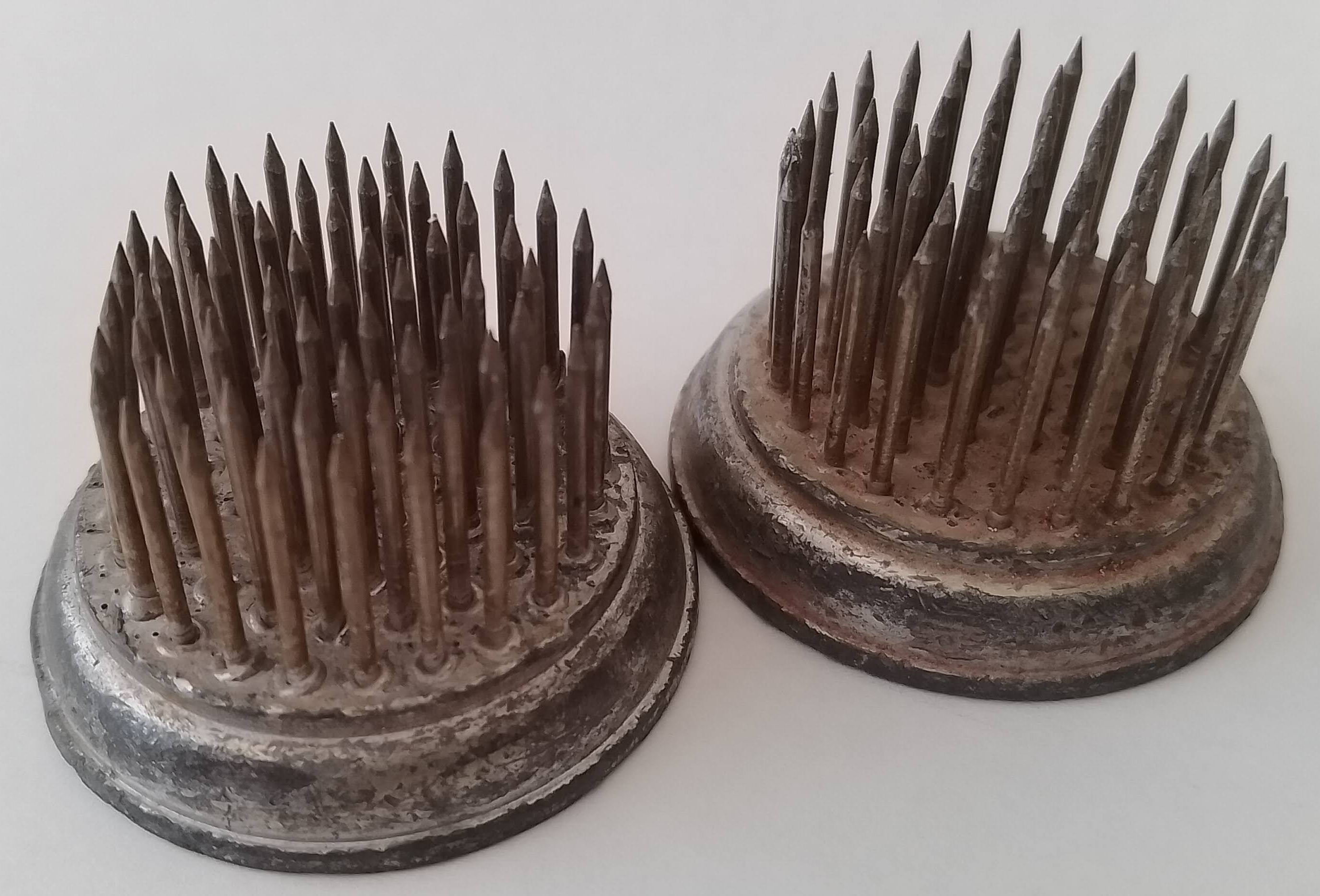
Lead base flower frogs of the kenzan type, 4 cm (1.6 in) round and 3 cm (1.2 in) tall

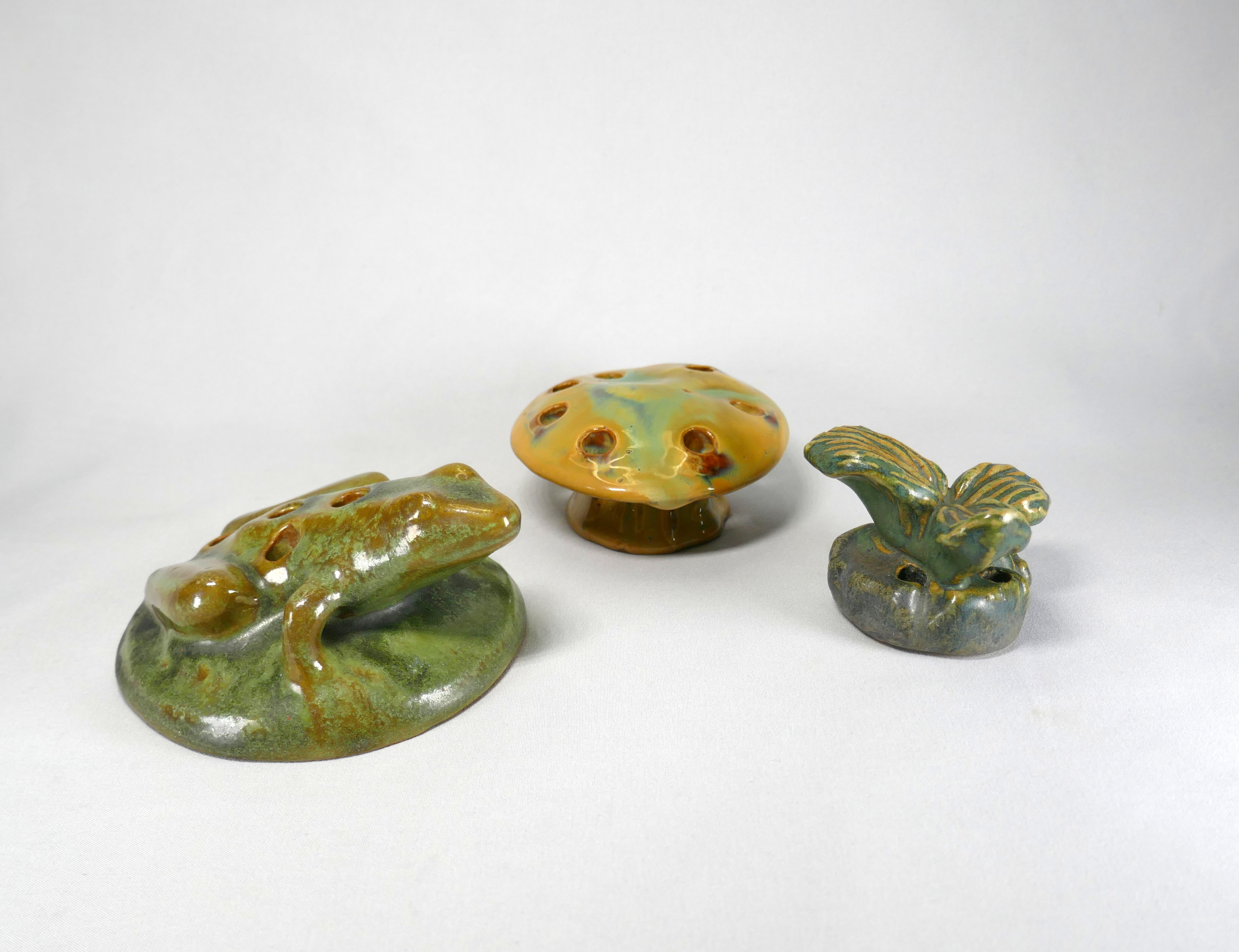
A collection of art pottery flower frogs from Fulper Pottery

Some, such as the Japanese kenzan, are utilitarian metal devices that fit into a vase or bowl and fix the stems by metal needles. Other designs use a number of holes or guides that stems could be fit through for arranging. A flurry of patents followed the metal flower frog popularity, all claiming to save the housewife time and allow her to quickly and creatively arrange flowers. Many types of flower frogs are art pieces with holes for flower stems and a container for holding water.
