= Liners =

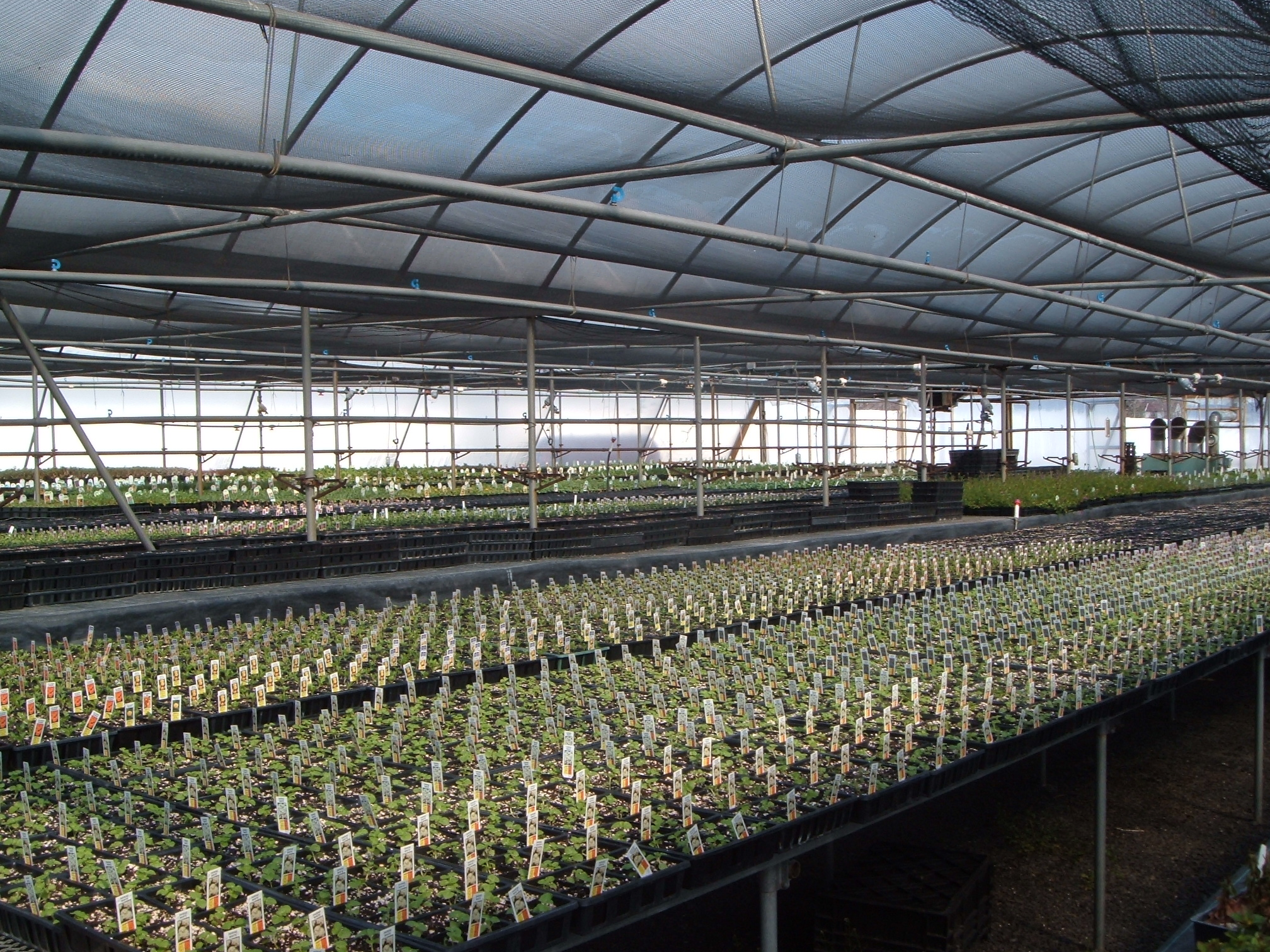
Liners being grown in a greenhouse.

"Liners" is a horticultural term referring to very young plants, usually grown for sale to retailers or wholesalers, who then grow them to a larger size before selling them to consumers. Liners are usually grown from seed, but may also be grown from cuttings or tissue culture. They are grown in plastic trays with many "cells," each of which contains a single liner plant. Liners will typically range in size from a 36 cell tray up to a 288 cell tray. The most common size used in commercial nurseries is between 50 and 72 cells. The term "liner", is typically used for perennial, ornamental, and woody seedlings. Annuals in this form are usually referred to as plugs.

According to the U.S. Department of Agriculture, plants can only be defined as "liners" if they are at least an inch in diameter but not more than 3 inches in diameter at the widest point. Plant liners must also have established root systems that touch the outer edges of the container and stay intact when lifted from the container.

The U.S. Department of Agriculture's National Plant Materials Manual defines "liner" as plant material which is grown in one location and then “lined-out” in another location for finishing off. Plants may be started in seedbeds and lifted bare-root or grown in containers. Either type of these liners may finish their production cycle in the ground or in containers.

A liner traditionally refers to lining out nursery stock in a field row. The term has evolved to mean a small plant produced from a rooted cutting, seedling, plug, or tissue culture plantlet. Direct sticking or direct rooting into smaller liner pots is commonly done in United States propagation nurseries. Seedlings and rooted cuttings can also be transplanted into small liner pots and allowed to become established during liner production, before being transplanted to larger containers (upcanned) or outplanted into the field.
