= Sod =

Upper layer of soil and grass

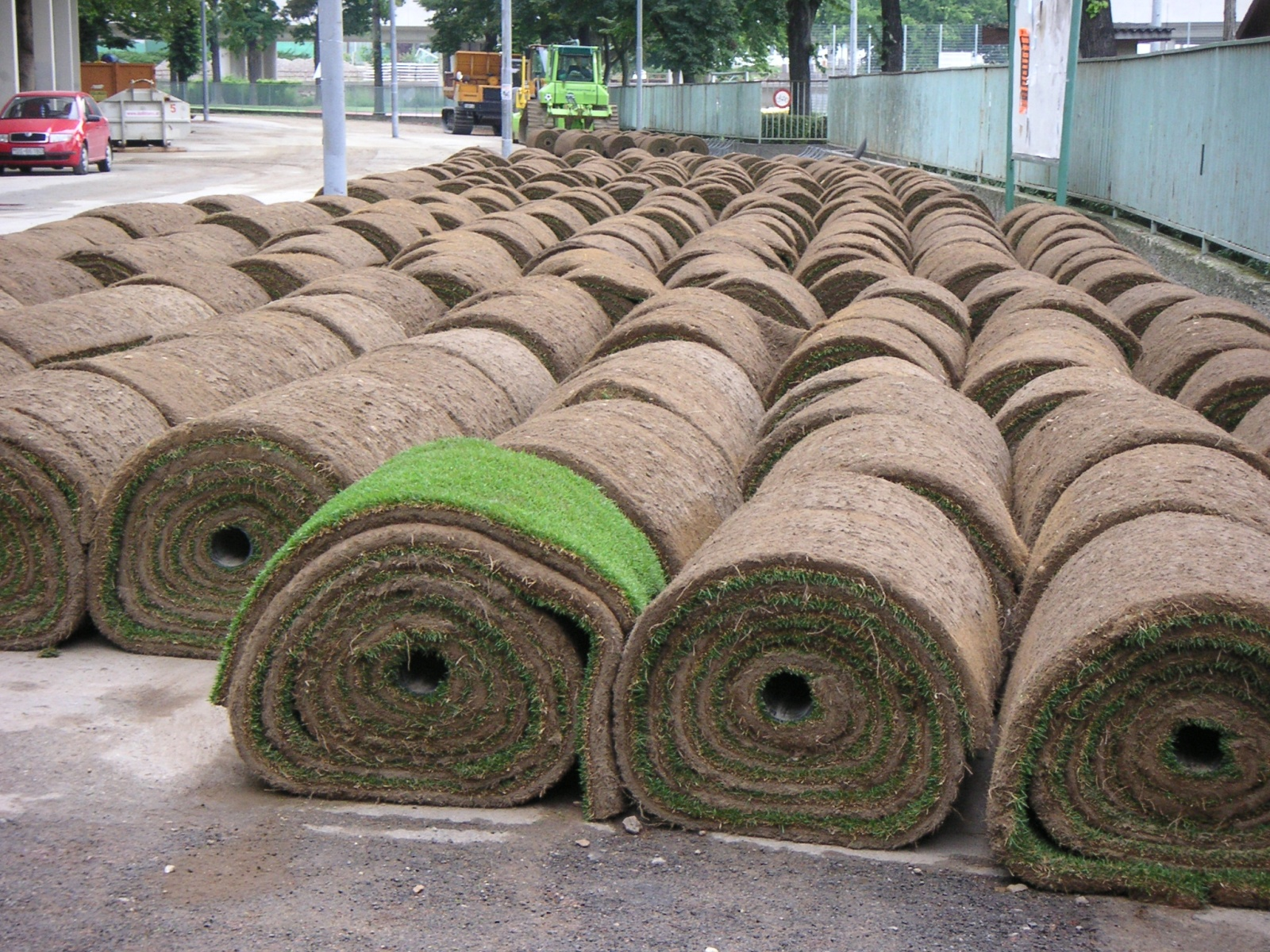
Turf rolls

Sod is the upper layer of turf that is harvested for transplanting. Turf consists of a variable thickness of a soil medium that supports a community of turfgrasses. Sod is typically made with grasses that spread laterally through the soil and form a dense mat. In British and Australian English, sod is more commonly known as turf and the term sod is mainly used in agriculture.

Sod is used to establish lawns or other greenways in spaces like golf courses or sports stadiums. Typically, after construction or other landscape disruption, builders, owners, and landscape specialists place sod to establish a grass cover.

Sod is grown on specialized farms; the grass is grown for 12 to 18 months before the sod is cut from the top layer of the soil and prepared for transportation. Sod is often cut in either squares or rolls, making it easier to transport and distribute. Different species of grass are grown in different geographic regions because of the differing climatic conditions. More recently, some producers have developed turf mixes that include wildflowers and other native plants.

== Uses ==
Sod is used around the world for lawns, golf courses, and sports stadiums. In residential construction, it is sold to landscapers, home builders, and home owners, who use it to quickly establish a lawn and avoid soil erosion. Sod can be used to repair small, dead or damaged areas of lawn, golf course, or athletic field, and is used as a quicker alternative to re-growing from seed. Sod is also effective in increasing cooling, improving air and water quality, and assisting in flood prevention by draining water.

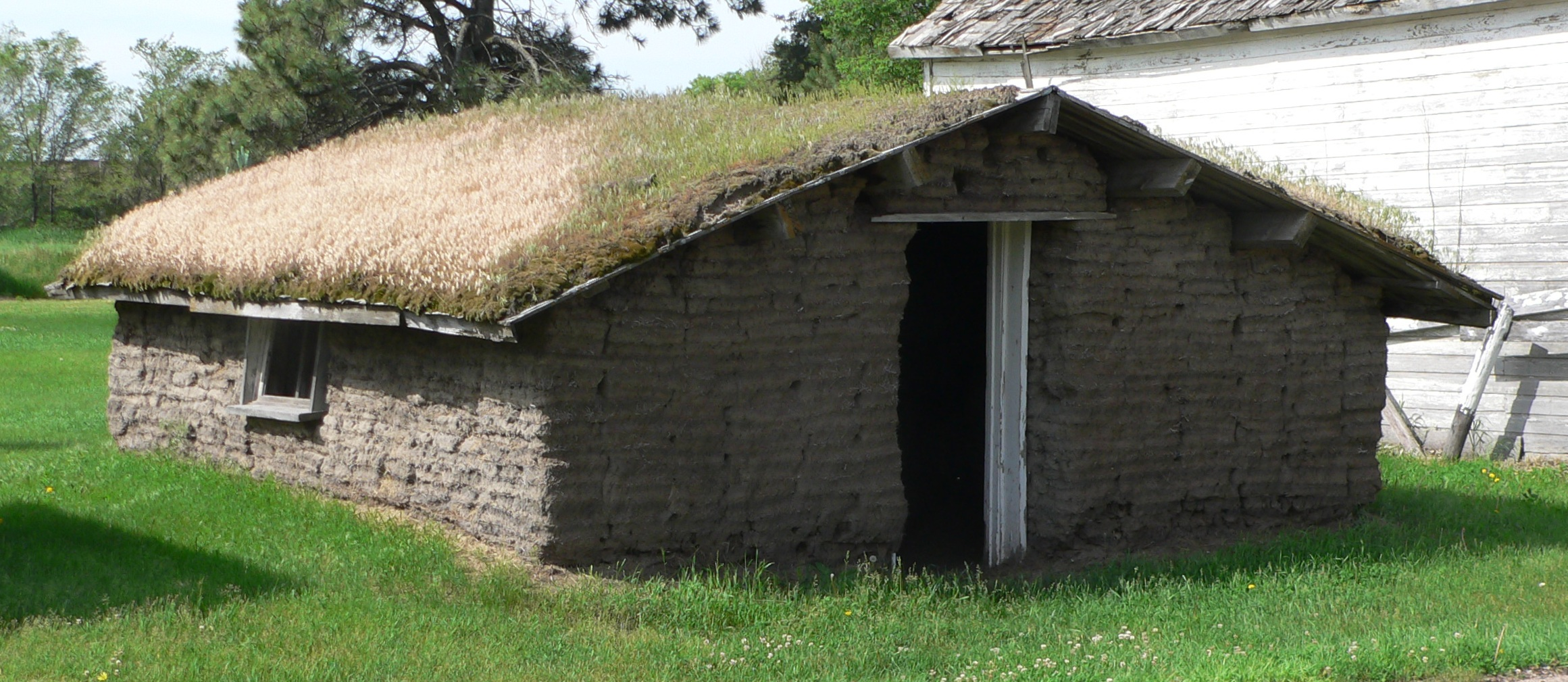
Sod was historically used as a building material in various parts of the world, including settlers in the American grassland and in Scandinavia. Modern construction sometimes includes similar applications in green roofs

Scandinavia has a long history of employing sod roofing, and a traditional house type is the Icelandic turf house.

In the United States, following the passage of the Homestead Act by Congress in 1862, settlers in the Great Plains used sod bricks to build sod houses. This was effective because prairie sod of the Great Plains was dense and difficult to cut, and was nicknamed "Nebraska marble". Blacksmith John Deere made his fortune when he became the first to make a plow that could reliably cut prairie sod.

Different types of grass are used for sod installation.

== Cultivation ==
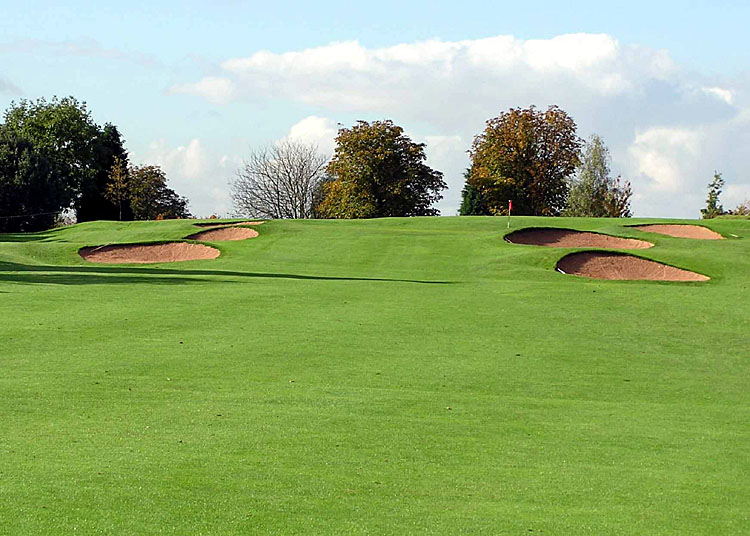
Golf course sod

Sod is grown on specialist farms, usually within 100 miles (160 km) of the target market. This minimizes both the cost of transportation and the risk of damage to the product. Sod-producing farms may have many varieties of grass growing in one location to best suit the consumer's use and preference. Sod is usually harvested 10 to 18 months after planting, depending on the growing climate. During cultivation, it undergoes fertilization, frequent mowing, watering, and in some cases, vacuuming to remove the clippings. It is harvested using specialized equipment that precisely cuts it to standardized sizes. Sod is typically harvested in small, square or rolled rectangular slabs, or 4-foot (1.2 m) wide rolls.

Prior to commercial sod cultivation, prospective consumers would pay farmers to cut and harvest their pastures.

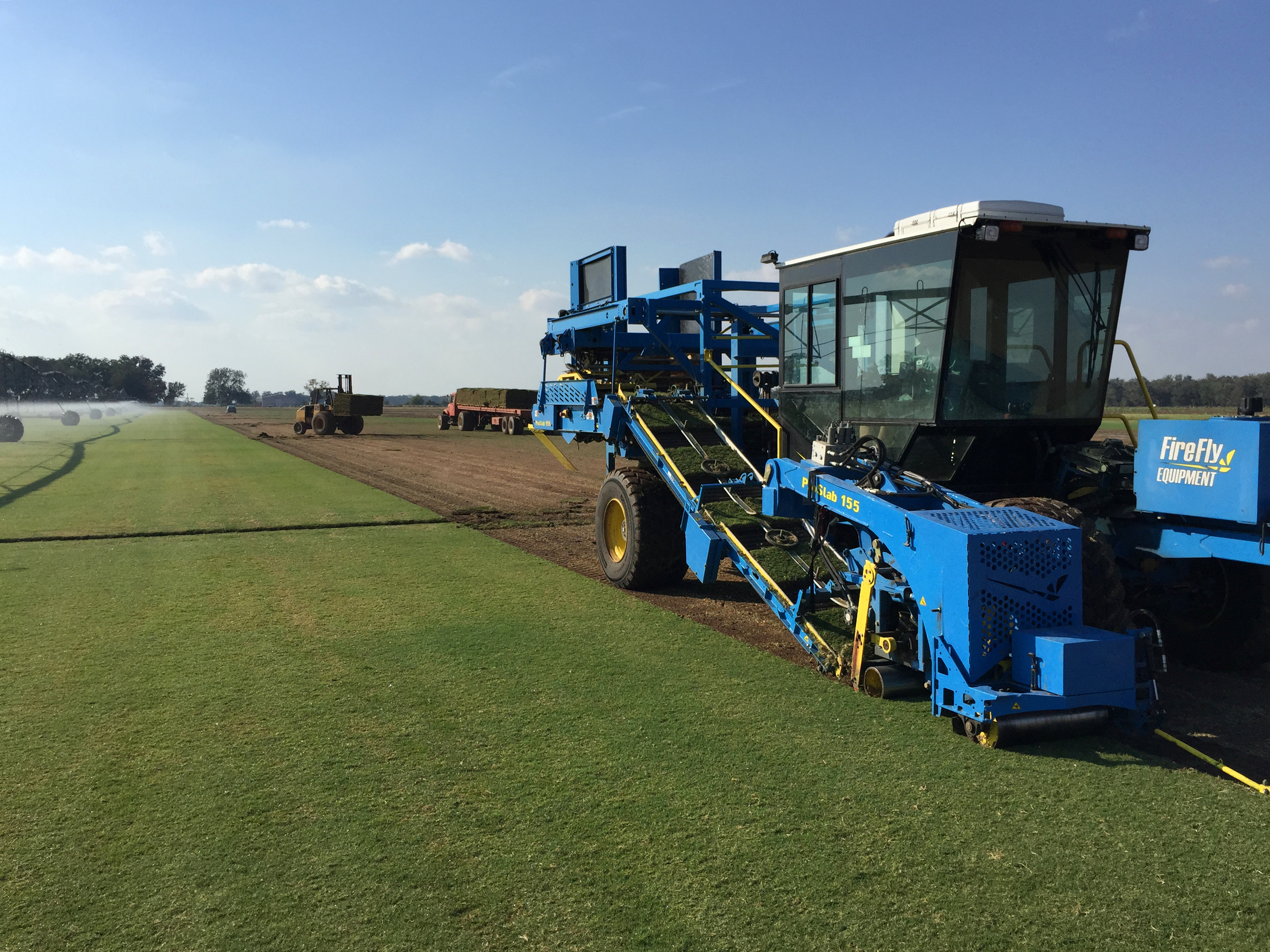
Harvesting sod

Mississippi State University developed a hydroponic method of cultivating sod in 2006. For the limited number of sod-exporting farms, this soilless sod may ship more efficiently and with less weight than traditional sod. Additionally, because it is not grown in soil, it does not need to be washed down to bare roots or sprigs, shortening the time and cost of exporting it.

=== Impact on soils ===
A study of sod farms in Turkey found harvesting sod causes a significant loss of topsoil and key nutrients, more than that of other kinds of agriculture in the region.

== Immediacy ==
Immediacy is a key factor in many applications, such as erosion control and athletic fields. Seed may be blown about by wind, eaten by birds, or fail because of drought. It takes some weeks to form a visually appealing lawn and further time before it is robust enough for use. Sod largely avoids these problems; with proper care, newly laid sod is usually fully functional within 30 days of installation, and its root system is comparable to that of a two-to-three-years-older seeding lawn. Sod reduces erosion by stabilizing the soil.

Many cultivars and some species can only be reproduced vegetatively rather than sexually via seed. For these, sod cultivation is the only means of producing additional plants. To grow these varieties, turf farms use a technique called sprigging; recently harvested sod mats are cut into slender rows and replanted in the field.

== Species used ==
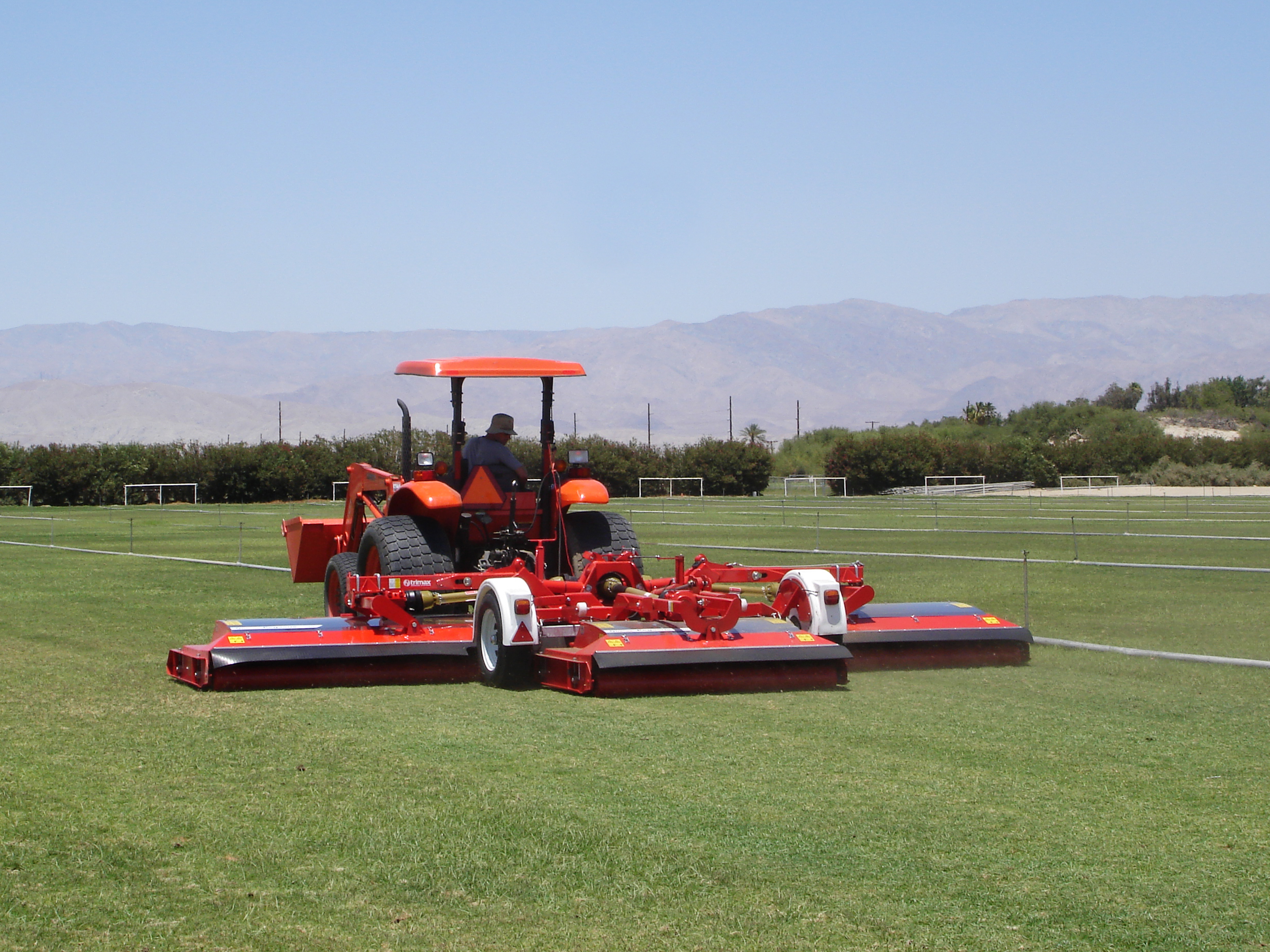
A typical roller mower operating on a sod grass farm

=== Fescue grass ===
==== Tall fescue ====
Tall fescue (Lolium arundinaceum), which is commonly used for sod, is a cool-season grass originating in Europe. It is moderately tolerant to drought and temperature extremes, and is popular in the temperate environments known as the "transition zone" in the turf and landscaping industries. In these areas, summers are too hot for most cool-season grasses, while winters are too cold for most warm-season grasses. Tall fescue is well adapted to various soils, moderately shade tolerant, and somewhat resistant to most diseases. It is vulnerable to Brown patch and Pythium blight. It grows most actively, and thus provides the most desirable appearance, in spring and fall, and requires moderate watering during summer. Due to its bunch-type growth habit, which is unique among common sod grasses, it does not spread aggressively or invade adjacent areas once established. Tall fescue does not actively fill in bare spots, and periodic maintenance such as overseeding may be required to maintain a uniform surface. This bunch-type growing habit contributes to a somewhat-lower wear tolerance compared to Kentucky Bluegrass or Bermuda grass, making it less commonly used for purposes such as athletic fields.

==== Fine fescues ====
Fine fescues (F. rubra, F. rubra subsp. commutata, F. trichophylla) are less popular as sod than the tall fescues. As their names suggest, they exhibit much thinner leaf blades and tolerate lower mowing heights than the tall fescues. They may be somewhat more resistant to common diseases and most generally prefer cool, shadier climates. Otherwise, their characteristics are similar, except for Creeping Red fescues (F. rubra), which spread via rhizomes and can form a dense sod. Fine fescues are generally used in mixtures with other grasses for shade and soil quality tolerance.

=== Kentucky bluegrass ===
Kentucky bluegrass (Poa pratensis) (also known as common or smooth-stocked meadow grass) is widely used in sod production and lawns throughout cool-season areas worldwide due to its cold tolerance, appearance, and ability to form a dense turf base. This species spreads via seed and underground rhizomes, allowing it to establish a strong root system that contributes to its natural sod-forming characteristics. These qualities are especially important for commercial sod production and use.

Numerous cultivars have been developed to enhance specific traits, such as drought resistance, shade tolerance, handling of disease, and overall turf quality. Cultivars such as 'Midnight', 'Barserati', and 'Blue Note' have consistently performed well in several trials, showing strong seasonal performance and resistance to common turfgrass diseases such as grey leaf spot and dollar spot.

Bella bluegrass Bella bluegrass, a Kentucky bluegrass variant, was developed by the University of Nebraska–Lincoln as a drought-resistant grass with potential to help conserve water. It was the first commercial vegetative bluegrass and is sold only as sod or plugs. The cultivar has pronounced lateral growth but has minimal vertical growth, only growing to about 4 inches (10 cm) in height. It may grow in poor soils and has seen some use across the northern United States.

=== Zoysia grass ===
Zoysia (Zoysia sp.) (Also known as Manila grass or Lawngrass in areas of the Far East) is a warm-season turfgrass native to Asia and naturalized primarily in the Americas. Common species used for turf include Zoysia japonica and Zoysia matrella, including various hybrids of both. The grass spreads gradually by means of both rhizomes and stolons, a growth habit that typically results in a dense turf base that can suppress the establishment of some weeds. Zoysia's slow, dense growth is also prone to developing a substantial layer of thatch, which is a mixture of dead and living organic material at the soil surface that can slow water and nutrients from reaching the roots and may require periodic removal. This density also provides tolerance to extreme temperatures, drought, and traffic.

Because the grass germinates and grows slowly, establishment from seed is often unsuccessful, and it is typically planted as sod or plugs. Compared to many turfgrasses typical in cool-season regions, established Zoysia generally requires less irrigation and fertilization during the growing season. Conversely, its slow growth rate means it is also slow to recover from damage or disease. As a warm-season grass, it enters dormancy and turns light brown after the first hard frost and generally breaks said dormancy when soil temperatures consistently rise above 50 °F (10 °C).

=== Bermuda grass ===
Bermuda grass (Cynodon dactylon) (also known as Couch grass in Oceania) is commonly used in lawns and for sports surfaces across the southern half of the United States, parts of the Lower Midwest, and in other warmer areas around the world. It typically tolerates a wide range of climates where warm-season perennials are regularly cultivated. Established Bermuda grass has a network of shoots, rhizomes, stolons, and crown tissue together that usually form a dense plant canopy. This dense plant canopy can be used to propagate clonal varieties by sod, sprigs, or plugs. The aggressive nature of Bermuda grass makes it not only a hardy turfgrass but also a challenging and invasive weed in land used for other purposes. Its two noted weaknesses are a low tolerance of shade and extended, prolonged periods of unprotected exposure to temperatures under 15 °F (−9 °C). Given the economic importance of Bermuda grass (as a turf product, agricultural forage, and, at times, as an invasive weed), it has been the subject of numerous studies.

Celebration

Celebration is a dark green cultivar with relatively high wear and drought tolerance. The varietal is a hybrid of Bermuda grass that was originally developed in Australia. It has been used at Raymond James Stadium and various golf courses in warm-climate regions.

TifTuf

TifTuf is a commonly used hybrid of Bermuda grass developed at the University of Georgia - Tifton Campus, as part of its long-standing turfgrass breeding program. The program has produced several broadly cultivated Bermuda grass varieties for many decades, such as Tifway 419, which remains widely used for sports fields and lawns.

=== St. Augustine grass ===
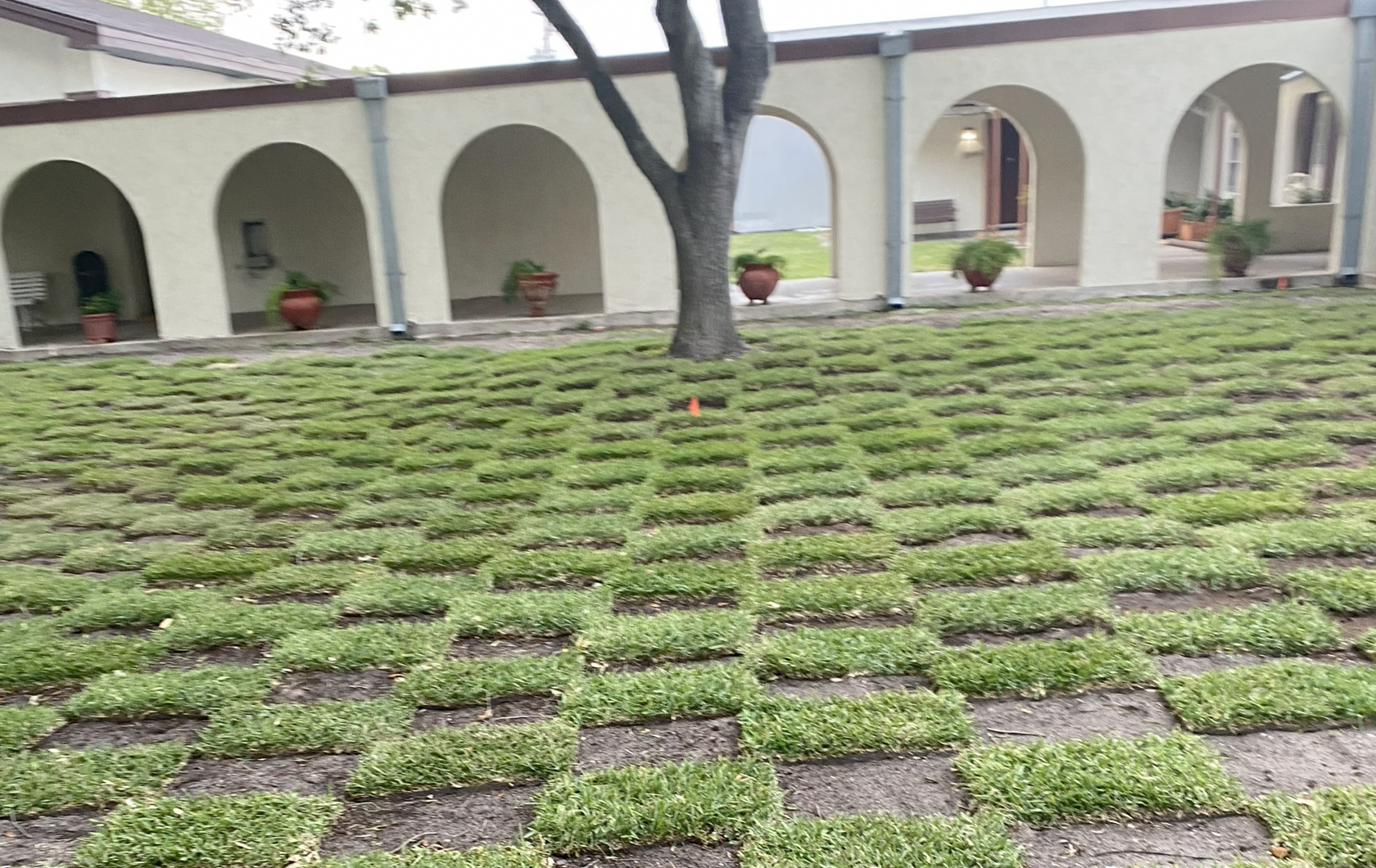
St. Augustine grass checker sod application. The grass will spread to cover the empty spaces.

St. Augustine grass (Stenotaphrum secundatum) (also known as Charleston grass in South Carolina and Buffalo grass or turf in Australia) is a widely used warm-season perennial grass. The species is of disputed origin and found throughout many subtropical areas of the United States. This grass is also commonly found and planted in built-up coastal areas across Australasia, Latin America, and low-lying portions of Sub-Saharan Africa.

As a tropical warm-season grass, it has limited tolerance to cold weather, lacking the pronounced winter dormancy and/or rhizomatous growth traits typically found in most common turfgrasses. It typically enters semi-dormancy or suffers severe damage at sustained temperatures around 32 °F (0 °C), and does not resume active growth until soil and air temperatures regularly exceed approximately 60 °F (16 °C).

The vast majority of this grass is established using plugs or sod, since viable seeds are rarely available outside of research settings due to production challenges.

Floratam:

Floratam is a common, widely planted cultivar developed jointly by the University of Florida and Texas A&M AgriLife. It was officially released in 1973 in response to widespread damage from St. Augustine Decline virus (SAD) and the Southern chinch bug, though resistance to the insect has decreased over time. Floratam does generally not tolerate dense shade and can suffer permanent cold damage below 40 °F (4 °C). Like other commercial cultivars, it spreads via stolons and must be planted as sod, plugs, or sprigs, as the seeds it produces are sterile.

=== Centipedegrass ===
Centipedegrass (Eremochloa ophiuroides) was introduced into the United States from southeastern Asia in 1916. It does well in the climate and soils of northern Florida and low-lying areas of the Deep South. It is the most common home lawn grass in the Florida Panhandle. Centipedegrass is generally considered a slow-growing, low-maintenance warm-season turfgrass with lower nutrient demands than a typical warm-season grass. Due to this growth habit, it typically requires less mowing and fertilization than several other turfgrass species. The species also usually holds its green color later into the fall than many other warm-season turfs and tends to green up early in the spring.

TifBlair

TifBlair is a frequently planted cultivar of centipedegrass used for low-input lawns and general turf areas in home and commercial settings. It's cultivated for said applications due to its very slow rate of vertical growth and low maintenance requirements. The hybrid was primarily developed in and named after Blairsville, Georgia and was released in the mid 1990s. TifBlair is also widely available as seed in addition to typical sod products.

== Wildflower turf ==
Wildflower turf (also called Bee or Pollinator grass) is a type of lawn alternative made up of a mixture of wildflower seeds. It is also mixed with common turf or native grasses in many commercial blends. The seeds are sown together and grow to form a lawn of flowers, rather than the monoculture of grass typical in a highly managed lawn. These types of plantings are generally considered a specialty turf and are rarely used in large-scale sod production. This grass mix can be a low-maintenance and sustainable alternative to traditional lawns that provides a habitat for beneficial insects and other wildlife. It often requires less watering and fertilization than traditional lawns. Wildflower turf can be used in the restoration of natural habitats, such as meadows, prairies, and wetlands. It is used on green roofs to provide a low-maintenance alternative to traditional green roof systems. Seed blends of this type can also help to capture carbon from the atmosphere, helping to mitigate the effects of climate change and to purify the air by absorbing pollutants and releasing oxygen.

== Natural turf communities ==
Low-growing vegetation is referred to as "turf communities" in areas where such growth is not common, as in moss-turf communities of sub Antarctica, some epifauna in the sea, coral reefs, and, in New Zealand, as species-rich communities of plants under 5 cm (1.97 in) tall, on coastal headlands, dune hollows, rivers and lakes, where most of the natural cover was forest. A form of turf community is a herbfield.

== Pest damage ==
=== Disease ===
Turfgrasses suffer from a wide number of fungal diseases, as well as some bacterial infections. Significantly improved sampling methodology for testing was introduced in 2023.

=== Insects and wildlife ===
Many plants, including most grasses, are highly susceptible to white grubs and other insects that primarily develop in the larval stage below ground. The larvae feed on the roots of the host plant, reducing its ability to absorb water and nutrients needed to stay healthy. The damage is often worsened by moles, raccoons, birds, and other local wildlife that dig up the turf in search of them. The most common beetle species responsible include the European chafer, June beetles, Asiatic garden beetle, and Japanese beetle.

== See also ==
- Cob (building)
- Divot
- Green track
- Groundbreaking
- Lawn
- Peat
