= Box blade =

Construction equipment

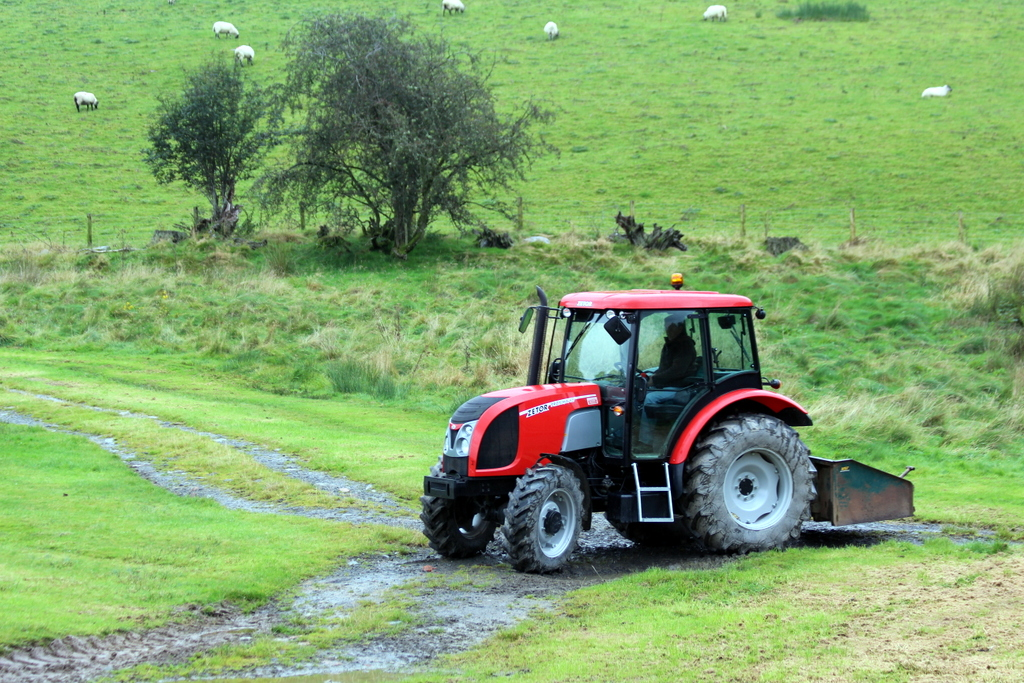
- A box blade attached to a tractor
- Dimensions: Typically 4–7 ft wide
- Primary Use: Land grading, leveling, contouring, and smoothing
- Related: Grader

A box blade (also box scraper) is a type of implement used on tractors for smoothing and contouring land. It is almost always unpowered, though can have auxiliary hydraulics attached in order for adjustments to be made without leaving the seat of the tractor. It is attached to the tractor via the three point hitch.

A variation of the rear blade which has developed into its own implement, with uses that parallel that of a rear blade, but are distinct. They consist of a heavy metal 3 sided box, with the front, top and bottom open. The front has retractable scarifiers, which can be used to break up hard ground. The rear has a forward and reverse cutting edge mounted at the bottom, with the reverse cutting edge often gated or floating on more expensive models. Box blades are usually very heavy due to the forces placed on them - even a lightweight one will weigh 500 pounds. The implement works going forward by scraping soil, carrying it forward as it rolls inside the box, and allowing some to work out as the blade passes over low spots. It works going back much like a dozer blade, pushing dirt, which can spill out the bottom or sides. Unlike a dozer blade, box blades are not adjustable relative to the tractor more than a few degrees in any direction, and generally only when the operator dismounts the tractor.

Primarily used for moving dirt, smoothing land, and contouring land. Most major tractor implement manufacturers make box blades, commercial laser guided models are coming into use which automatically level the blade via reference to an external laser.

Three point road graders can be viewed as a specific type of box blade, and are used to grade and maintain dirt and gravel roads. They usually have 2 parallel angled cutting edges, and long, low sidepieces.
