= Sprigging =

Method for plant propagation

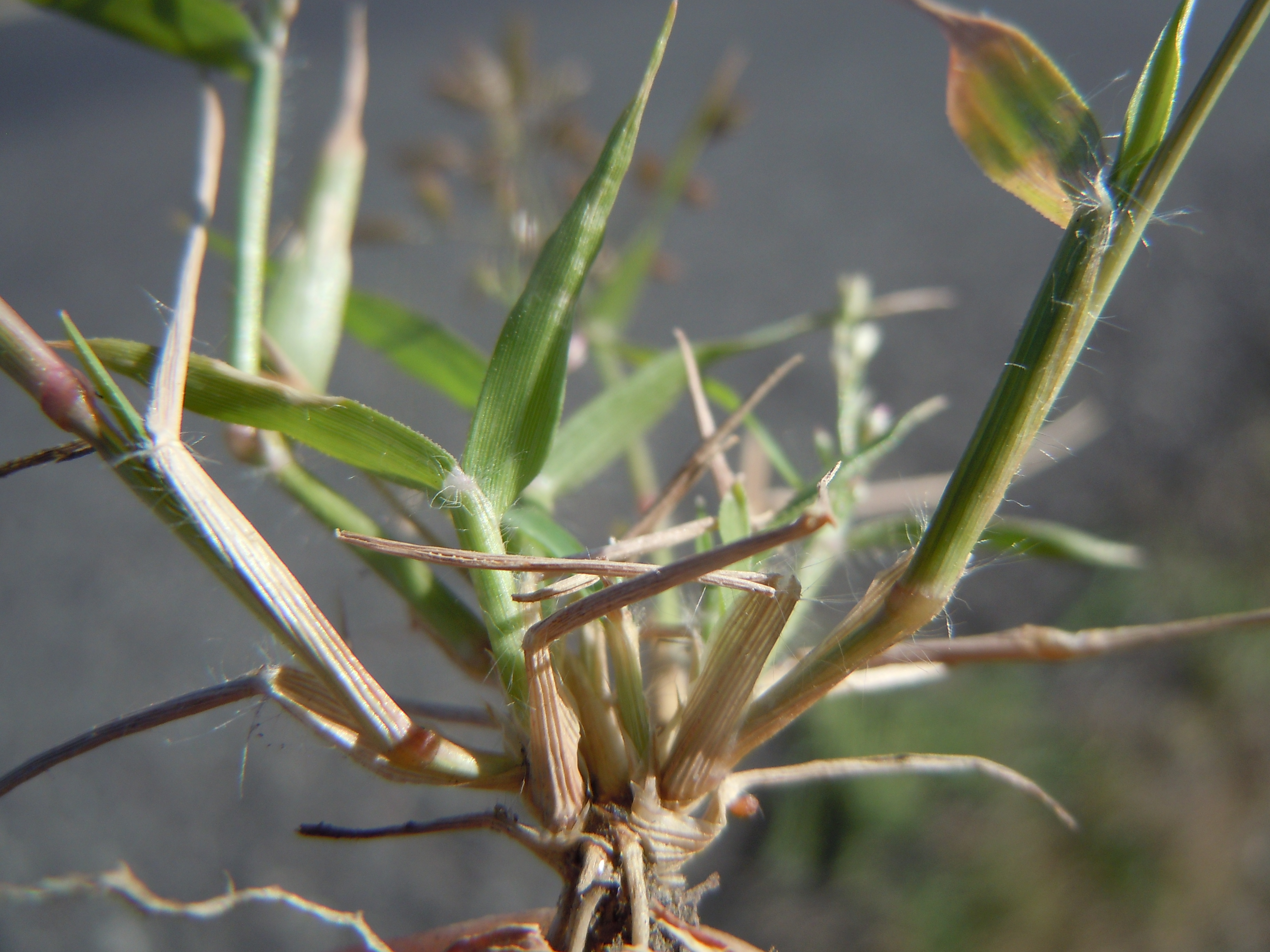
A sprig of Eragrostis minor grass

Sprigging is the planting of sprigs, plant sections cut from rhizomes or stolons that includes crowns and roots, at spaced intervals in furrows or holes. Depending on the environment, this may be done by hand or with mechanical row planters. Sprigging uses no soil with the plant, and is an alternative to seeding (planting seeds directly), plugging (transplanting plugs with intact soil and roots), and sodding (installing harvested sheets of sod).

Stolonizing is essentially broadcast sprigging, using cut stolons and rhizomes spread uniformly over an area mechanically or by hand, then covered with soil or pressed into the planting bed by various means.

Hydrosprigging, similar to hydroseeding, is the use of sprigs or cut stolons and rhizomes in a slurry of fertilizer, mulch, and binding agent, sprayed with a hose over a target area. This can be effective in areas sensitive to soil surface disturbance, such as eroding shorelines, hillsides or other slopes of varying steepness, or in diversion channels. The slurry can be sprayed over 1,000 feet (300 m) from a 1.5 in (3.8 cm) hose.
