= Plug (horticulture) =

Seedling grown in a tray

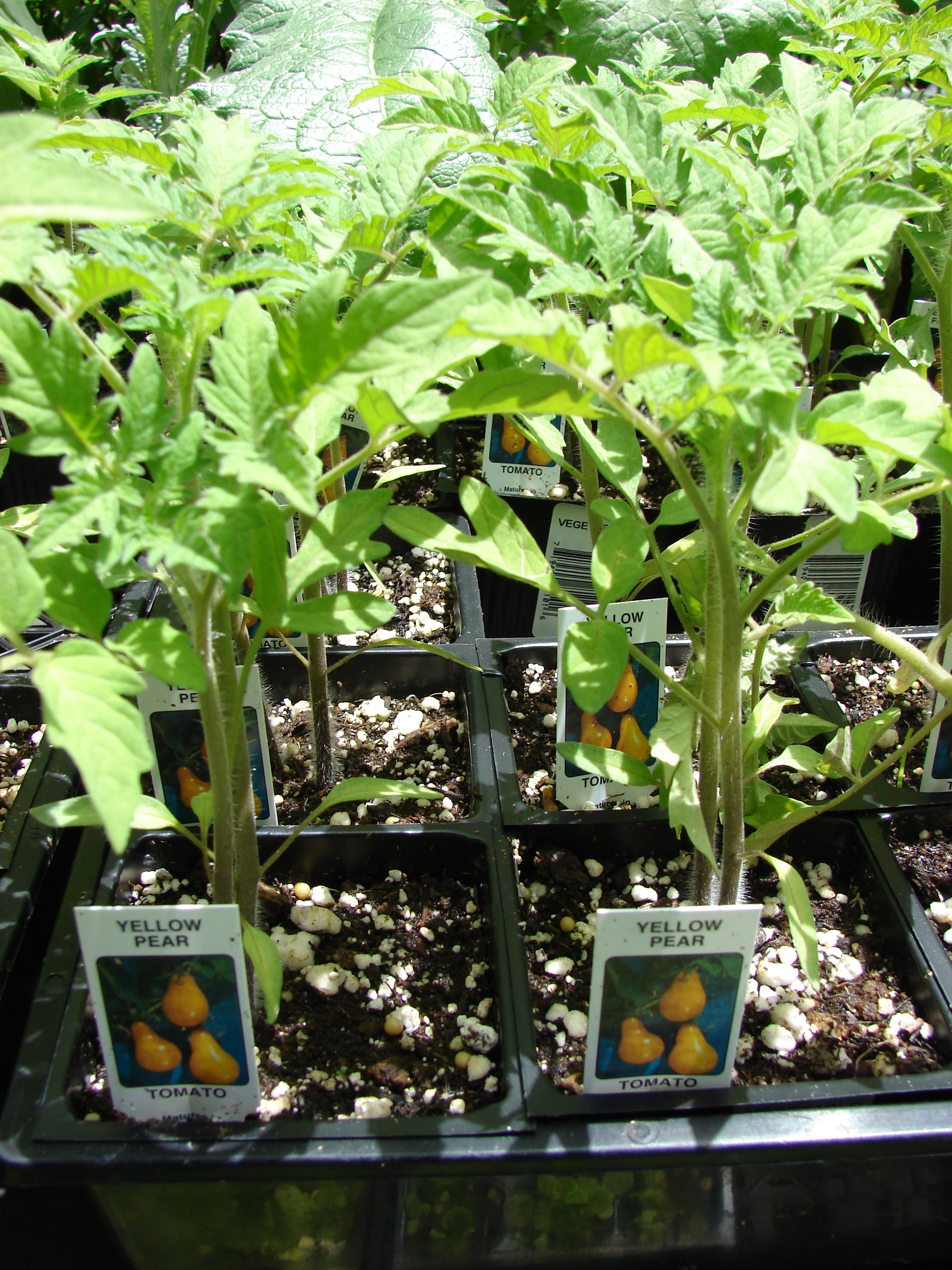
Plugs of yellow pear tomatoes

Plugs in horticulture are small-sized seedlings grown in seed trays filled with potting soil. This type of plug is used for commercially raising vegetables and bedding plants. Similarly plugs may also refer to small sections of lawn grass sod. After being planted, lawn grass may somewhat spread over an adjacent area.

Plug plants are young plants raised in small, individual cells, ready to be transplanted into containers or a garden. Professionally raised vegetable/flowering plants in controlled conditions during their important formative period (the first 4–6 weeks) can help to ensure plant health and for plants to reach their maximum potential during the harvest/blooming period. Establishing a garden using plug plants is often easier than doing so starting from seed. According to the American National Standards a plug is a cylinder of medium in which a plant is grown. The term is generally used to describe seedlings and rooted cuttings which have been removed from the container but with the medium held intact by the roots.

== Overview ==
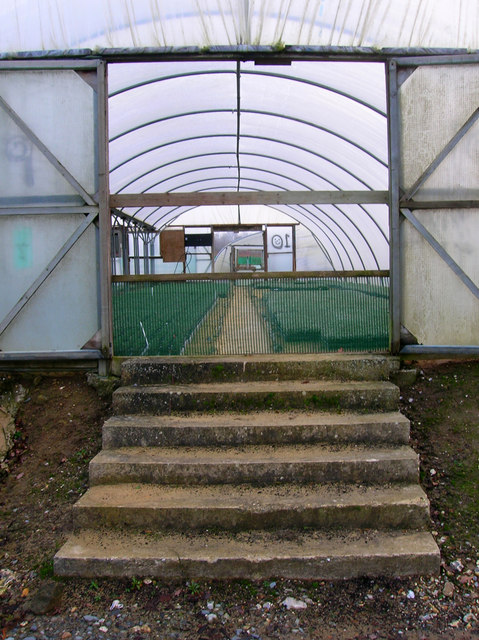
Plugs growing in a greenhouse at New Place Nurseries in Pulborough, West Sussex, England

Planting from plugs reduces the time a crop resides in the ground, and is functional for those with limited space. Plugs can improve yields: a healthy, stocky plant will grow rapidly and symmetrically when planted out, with a potentially greater capacity to withstand pests, disease and drought. Raising some types of seedlings successfully can be difficult, so plug plants can be beneficial for less experienced gardeners. Plug plants are beneficial for gardeners who want to try a new variety or a range of varieties without purchasing numerous packets of seeds and starting the plants from seed. Plug plants are very useful if the sowing window is missed, and plugs can be purchased quickly to replace a crop which has failed.

As a garden develops, interplanting (intercropping) existing crops with plugs plants, ideally companion plants, can improve the productivity of the space and so maximise harvests – a sown crop may not be able to compete with established plants. Plug plants are much easier to weed than sown seedlings, and weeding will need to be done less frequently.

Having semi-grown plants simplifies designing a vegetable plot or container. As plants that have already started growth, the time to attain plant growth is lessened. Within days of planting signs of growth are typically visible: leaves will perk up and roots anchor into the soil. Air pruned plugs are grown in a manner to promote very rapid growth almost immediately after being transplanted to new soil.

Plugs are sometimes used in hillside plasticulture applications, due to the ease in which they are transplanted.

== Plant cultivation and growth ==
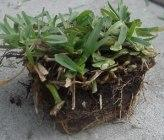
A plug of St. Augustine grass ready for sprigging

Plug plants grow more consistently, as has been noted by the commercial scale vegetable growing industry, and more rapidly; large-scale brassica field crops are planted almost exclusively from soil block plugs in some parts of Europe, a trend which is growing in the UK. This success at the commercial scale is testament to the success of plugs in the ground.

It is of note that many varieties actively benefit from being transplanted as severing the taproot encourages bushier root growth. Traditionally nearly all heading brassica are sown in a separate seed bed, thinned, and the best ones planted in a prepared bed after about 6–8 weeks. Many pests want to eat baby brassica; this in combination with its long growing season makes planting brassica from plugs a much easier option.

== Root vegetables ==
Root vegetables are typically, but not always, sown from seed, rather than transplanted from plugs, where they are to mature and then be thinned. The thinning action is highly beneficial in itself as it provides soil aeration at depth without disturbing adjacent roots systems. The initial concentration of seedlings also dilutes damage from pests and provided some food for the gardener or the compost in the form of thinnings. Beetroot, carrots and the root brassica family- swede, turnip- will simply not reach their full potential with any check to early root growth. In addition, these seeds are typically inexpensive, and the seedlings are delicate; hence there is little value to the gardener in buying or growing them as plugs.

== Images ==
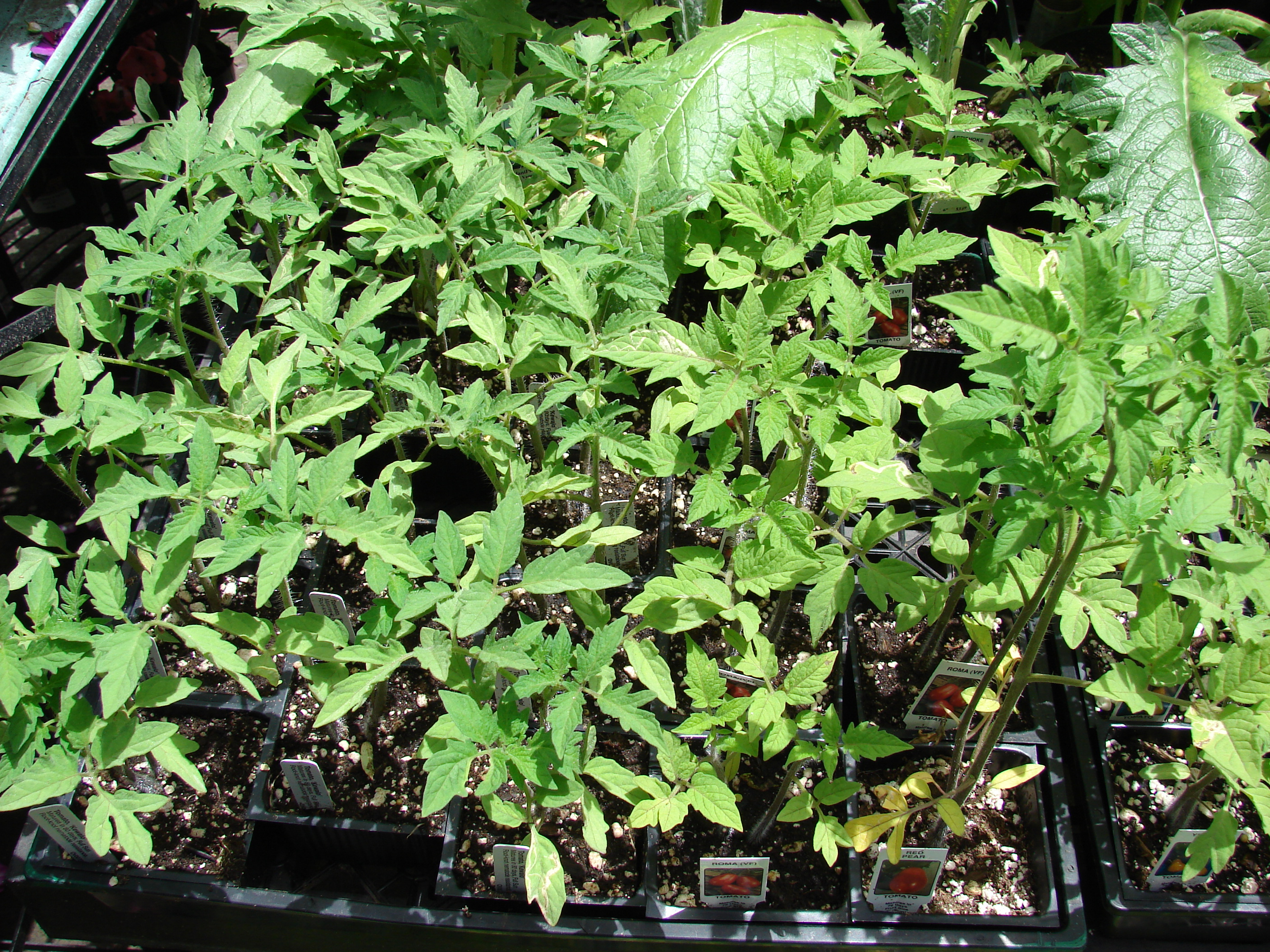
Plug tomato plants (Solanum lycopersicum var. lycopersicum (habit))

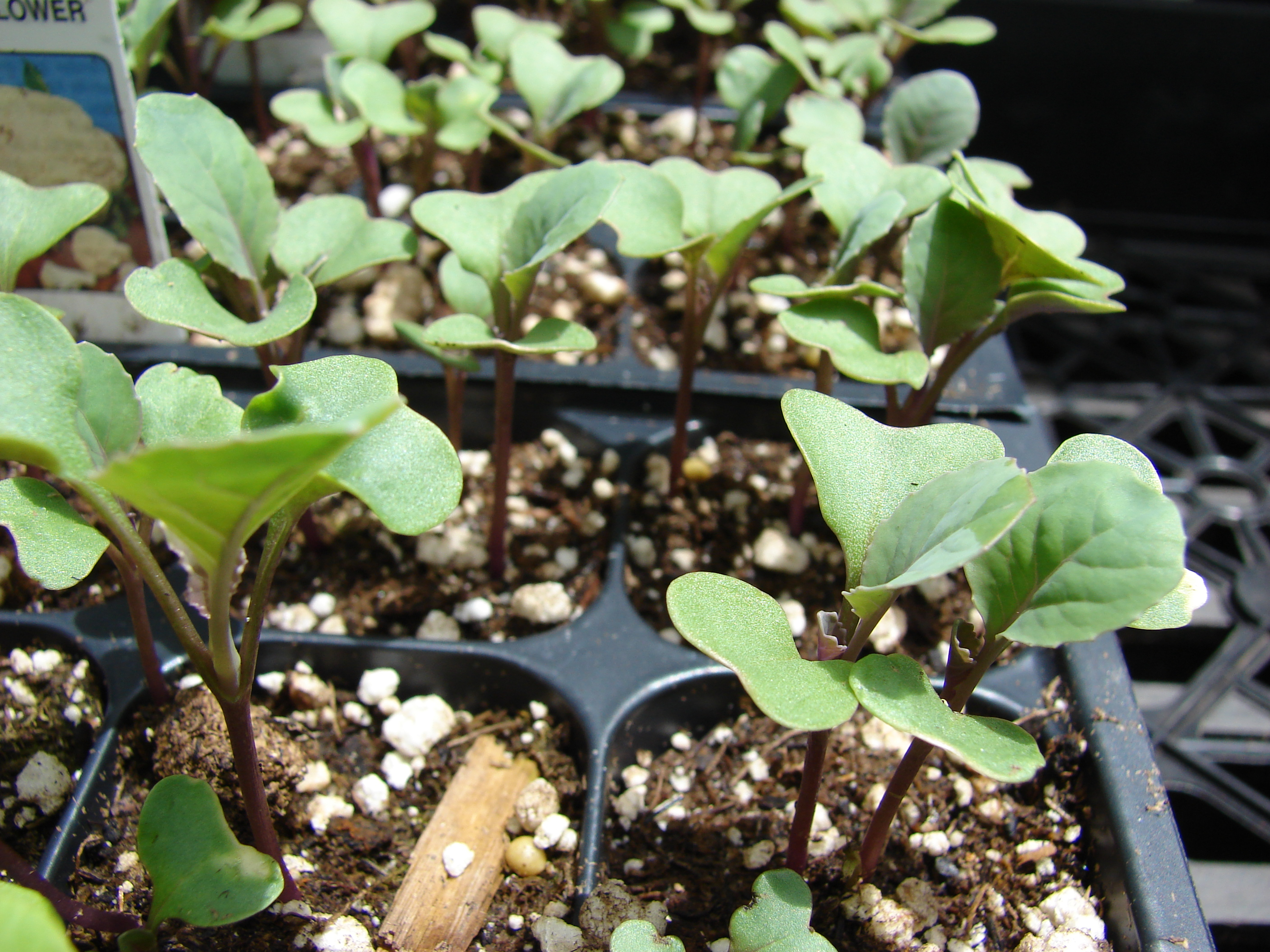
Plug cauliflower plants (Brassica oleracea var. botrytis (cauliflower habit))

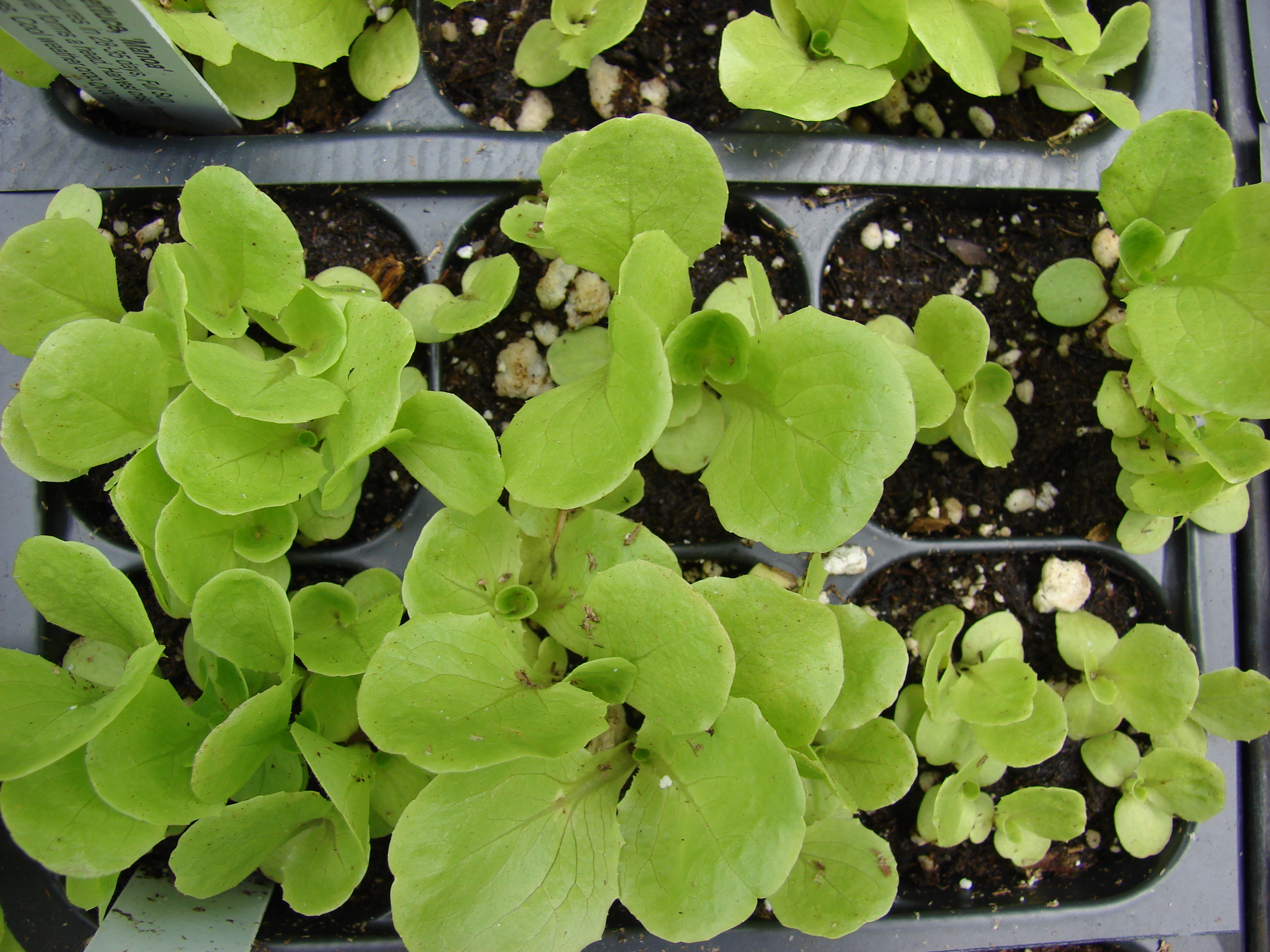
Small plugs of lettuce (Lactuca sativa (Manoa habit))

== See also ==
- Transplanting § Transplant production systems
