= Dethatcher =

Device that removes thatch from lawns

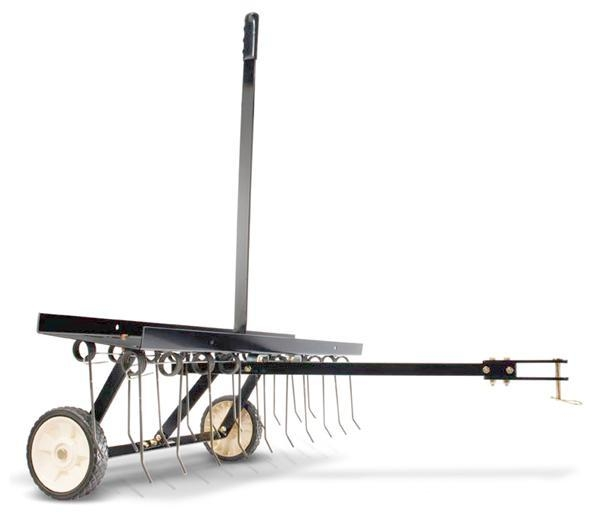
Tow tine dethatchers can be attached to garden tractors

A dethatcher or lawn scarifier is a device that removes thatch from lawns. Types of dethatchers include motorized dethatchers or those that can be pulled behind a garden tractor.

== Thatch removal (dethatching) ==
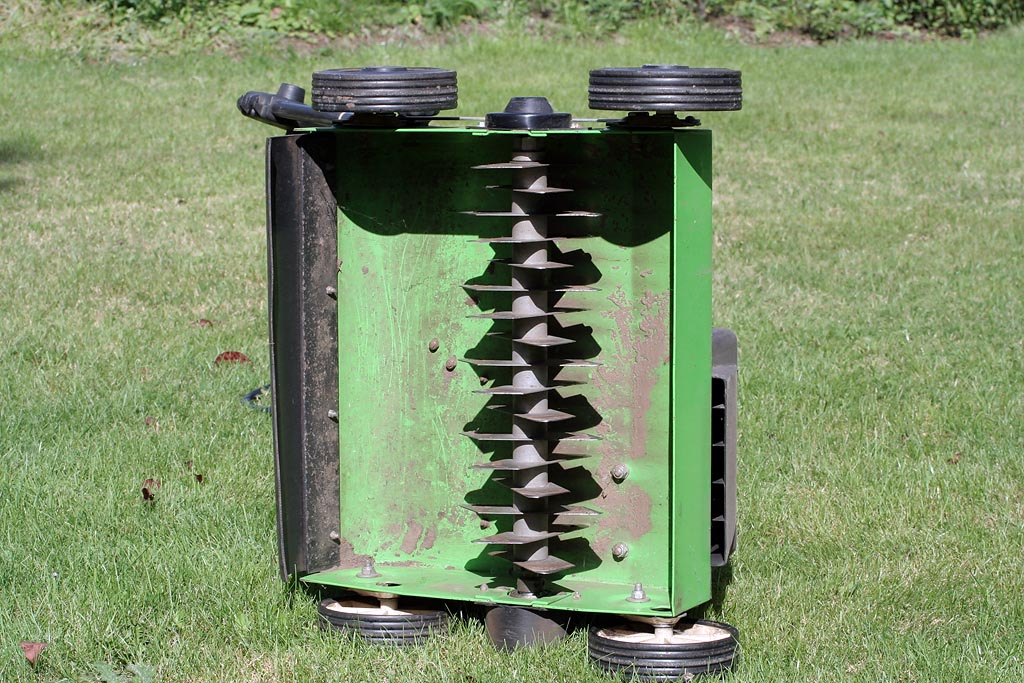
Bottom side of an electric lawn scarifier showing rotating metal blades

Scarification or de-thatching of lawns or turf is a mechanical process whereby the surface and subsurface of the lawn, green or sports pitch is rigorously abraded by penetrating metal blades, tines or prongs.

The process is usually carried out by machines of a professional standard which are normally powered by gasoline engines. Smaller, less rigorous electric machines are also available for the domestic market. The process of scarifying is designed to remove thatch from lawns.

Thatch is a build-up of organic matter which can include dead grass, leaves, stems, stolons, rhizomes and overcrowded grass roots and lateral weed growth. Thatch can stifle the growth and health of grass or turf. Removing the thatch helps the grass by encouraging it to thicken up and also makes it stronger and less susceptible to disease. Reducing thatch levels increases the levels of water, air and nutrients that can get through to the root zone of the grass plants. Significant thatch problems in lawns can cause diseases and can encourage moss to grow in the areas where grass has died. A by-product of scarifying or de-thatching is that moss is also removed, and depending on how deep the scarifying blades are set, root cutting can also occur, and this in turn helps grass to thicken up over time. Scarifying is normally carried out in autumn or spring. When scarifying or de-thatching, not all thatch should be removed as a small amount of thatch is beneficial to the lawn. A lawn that has excessive thatch may feel spongy when trodden upon. After removing thatch, it can be swept or raked up using a lawn sweeper.
