= Transplanting =

Gardening technique

In agriculture and gardening, transplanting or replanting is the technique of moving a plant from one location to another. Most often this takes the form of starting a plant from seed in optimal conditions, such as in a greenhouse or protected nursery bed, then replanting it in another, usually outdoor, growing location. The agricultural machine that does this is called a transplanter. This is common in market gardening and truck farming, where setting out or planting out are synonymous with transplanting. In the horticulture of some ornamental plants, transplants are used infrequently and carefully because they carry with them a significant risk of killing the plant.

Transplanting has a variety of applications, including:

- Extending the growing season by starting plants indoors, before outdoor conditions are favorable;
- Protecting young plants from diseases and pests until they are sufficiently established;
- Avoiding germination problems by setting out seedlings instead of direct seeding.

Different species and varieties react differently to transplanting; for some, it is not recommended. In all cases, avoiding transplant shock—the stress or damage received in the process—is the principal concern. Plants raised in protected conditions usually need a period of acclimatization, known as hardening off (see also frost hardiness). Also, root disturbance should be minimized. The stage of growth at which transplanting takes place, the weather conditions during transplanting, and treatment immediately after transplanting are other important factors.

== Transplant production systems ==
Commercial growers employ what are called containerized and non-containerized transplant production.

Containerized transplants or plugs allow separately grown plants to be transplanted with the roots and soil intact. Typically grown in peat pots (a pot made of compressed peat), soil blocks (compressed blocks of soil), paper pots or multiple-cell containers such as plastic packs (four to twelve cells) or larger plug trays made of plastic or styrofoam.

Non-containerized transplants are typically grown in greenhouse ground beds or benches, outdoors in-ground with row covers and hotbeds, and in-ground in the open field. The plants are pulled with bare roots for transplanting, which are less-expensive than containerized transplants, but with lower yields due to poorer plant reestablishment.

== Containerized stock ==
Containerized planting stock is classified by the type and size of container used. A great variety of containers has been used, with various degrees of success. Some containers are designed to be planted with the tree e.g., the tar paper pot, the Alberta peat sausage, the Walters square bullet, and paper pot systems, are filled with rooting medium and planted with the tree (Tinus and McDonald 1979). Also planted with the tree are other containers that are not filled with rooting medium, but in which the container is a molded block of growing medium, as with Polyloam, Tree Start, and BR-8 Blocks.

Designs of containers for raising planting stock have been many and various. Containerized white spruce stock is now the norm. Most containers are tube-like; both diameter and volume affect white spruce growth (Hocking and Mitchell 1975, Carlson and Endean 1976). White spruce grown in a container having a 1:1 height:diameter produced significantly greater dry weight than those in containers of 3:1 and 6:1 height:diameter configurations. Total dry weight and shoot length increased with increasing container volume. The larger the bag the fewer deployed per unit area. However, the biological advantage of size has been enough to influence a pronounced swing towards larger containers in British Columbia (Coates et al. 1994). The number of PSB211 (2 cm top diameter, 11 cm long) styroblock plugs ordered in British Columbia decreased from 14,246,000 in 1981 to zero in 1990, while orders for PSB415 (4 cm top diameter, 15 cm long) styroblock plugs increased in the same period from 257 000 to 41 008 000, although large stock is more expensive than small to raise, distribute, and plant.

Other containers are not planted with the tree, e.g., Styroblock, Superblock, Copperblock, and Miniblock container systems, produce Styroplug seedlings with roots in a cohesive plug of growing medium. The plug cavities vary in volume by various combinations of top diameter and depth, from 39 to 3260 mL, but those most commonly used, at least in British Columbia, are in the range 39 mL to 133 mL (Van Eerden and Gates 1990). The BC-CFS Styroblock plug, developed in 1969/70, has become the dominant stock type for interior spruce in British Columbia (Van Eerden and Gates 1990, Coates et al. 1994). Plug sizes are indicated by a 3-figure designation, the 1st figure of which gives the top diameter and the other 2 figures the depth of the plug cavity, both dimensions approximations in centimetres. The demand for larger plugs has been increasing strongly (Table 6.24; Coates et al. 1994). Stock raised in some sizes of plug can vary in age class. In British Columbia, for example, PSB 415 and PSB 313 plugs are raised as 1+0 or 2+0. PSB 615 plugs are seldom raised other than as 2+0.

Initially, the intention was to leave the plugs in situ in the Styroblocks until immediately before planting. But this led to logistic problems and reduced the efficiency of planting operations. Studies to compare the performance of extracted, packaged stock versus in situ stock seem not to have been carried out, but packaged stock has performed well and given no indication of distress.

== Forestry ==
=== Field storage ===
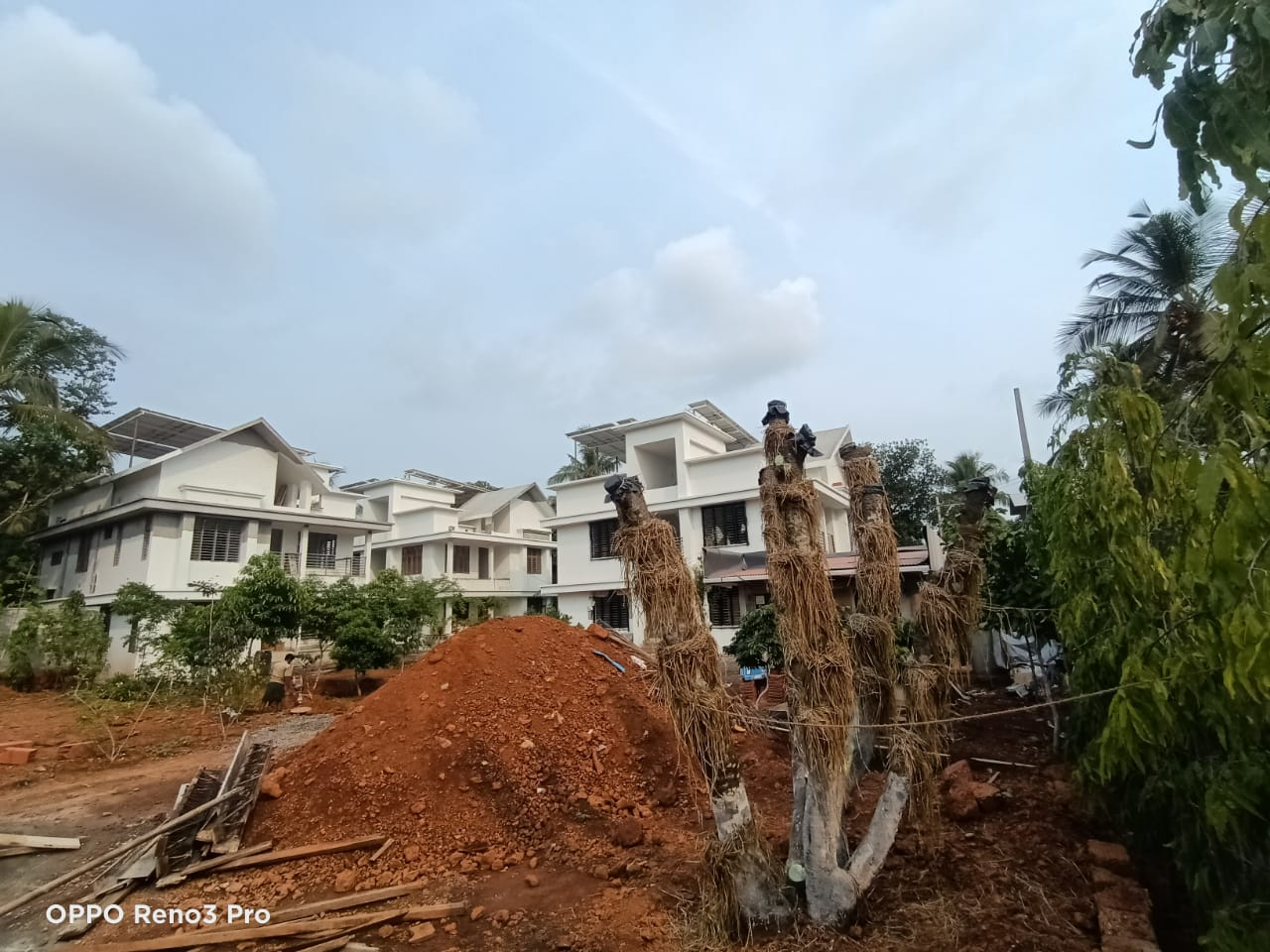
Pongamia pinnata Tree transplantation

As advocated by Coates et al. (1994), thawed planting stock taken to the field should optimally be kept cool at 1 °C to 2 °C in relative humidities over 90% (Ronco 1972a). For a few days, storage temperatures around 4.5 °C and humidities about 50% can be tolerated. Binder and Fielder (1988) recommended that boxed seedlings retrieved from cold storage should not be exposed to temperatures above 10 °C. Refrigerator vans commonly used for transportation and on-site storage normally ‘maintain seedlings at 2 °C to 4 °C (Mitchell et al. 1980). Ronco (1972a, b) cautioned against using dry ice (solid carbon dioxide) to cool seedlings; he claimed that respiration and water transport in seedlings are disrupted by high concentrations of gaseous carbon dioxide.

Coniferous planting stock is often held in frozen storage, mostly at −2 °C, for extended periods and then cool-stored (+2 °C) to thaw the root plug prior to outplanting. Thawing is necessary if frozen seedlings cannot be separated from one another and has been advocated by some in order to avoid possible loss of contact between plug and soil with shrinkage of the plug with melting of ice in the plug. Physiological activity is also greater under cool rather than frozen storage, but seedlings of interior spruce and Engelmann spruce that were planted while still frozen had only brief and transient physiological effects, including xylem water potential, (Camm et al. 1995, Silem and Guy 1998). After 1 growing season, growth parameters did not differ between seedlings planted frozen and those planted thawed.

Studies of storage and planting practices have generally focussed on the effects of duration of frozen storage and the effects of subsequent cool storage (e.g., Ritchie et al. 1985, Chomba et al. 1993, Harper and Camm 1993). Reviews of colds storage techniques have paid little attention to the thawing process (Camm et al. 1994), or have merely noted that the rate of thawing is unlikely to cause damage (McKay 1997).

Kooistra and Bakker (2002) noted several lines of evidence suggesting that cool storage can have negative effects on seedling health. The rate of respiration is faster during cool storage than in frozen storage, so depleting carbohydrate reserves more rapidly. Certainly in the absence of light during cool storage, and to an indeterminate extent if seedlings are exposed to light (unusual), carbohydrate reserves are depleted (Wang and Zwiacek 1999). As well, Silem and Guy (1998), for instance, found that interior spruce seedlings had significantly lower total carbohydrate reserves if stored for 2 weeks at 2 °C than if thawed rapidly for 24 hours at 15 °C. Seedlings can rapidly lose cold hardiness in cool storage through increased respiration and consumption of intracellular sugars that function as cryoprotectants (Ogren 1997). Also, depletion of carbohydrate reserves impairs the ability of seedlings to make root growth. Finally, storage moulds are much more of a problem during cool than frozen storage.

Kooistra and Bakker (2002), therefore, tested the hypothesis that such thawing is unnecessary. Seedlings of 3 species, including interior spruce were planted with frozen root plugs (frozen seedlings) and with thawed root plugs (thawed seedlings). Thawed root plugs warmed to soil temperature in about 20 minutes; frozen root plugs took about 2 hours, ice in the plug having to melt before the temperature could rise above zero. Size of root plug influenced thawing time. These outplantings were into warm soil by boreal standards, and seedlings with frozen plugs might fare differently if outplanted into soil at temperatures more typical of planting sites in spring and at high elevations. Variable fluorescence did not differ between thawed and frozen seedlings. Bud break was no faster among thawed interior spruce seedlings than among frozen. Field performance did not differ between thawed and frozen seedlings.

== Gallery ==
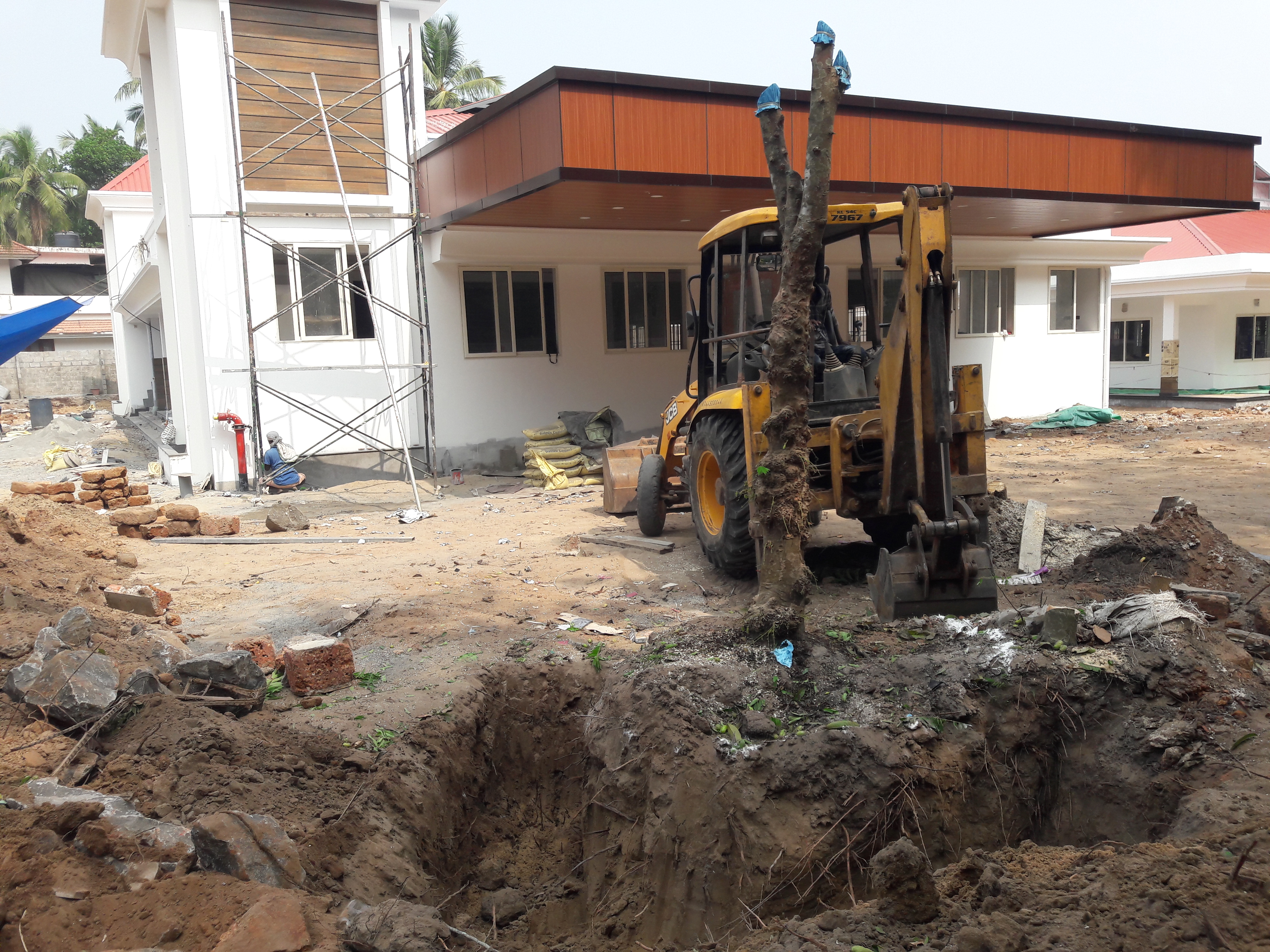
Transplanting a bilimbi tree (Averrhoa bilimbi)

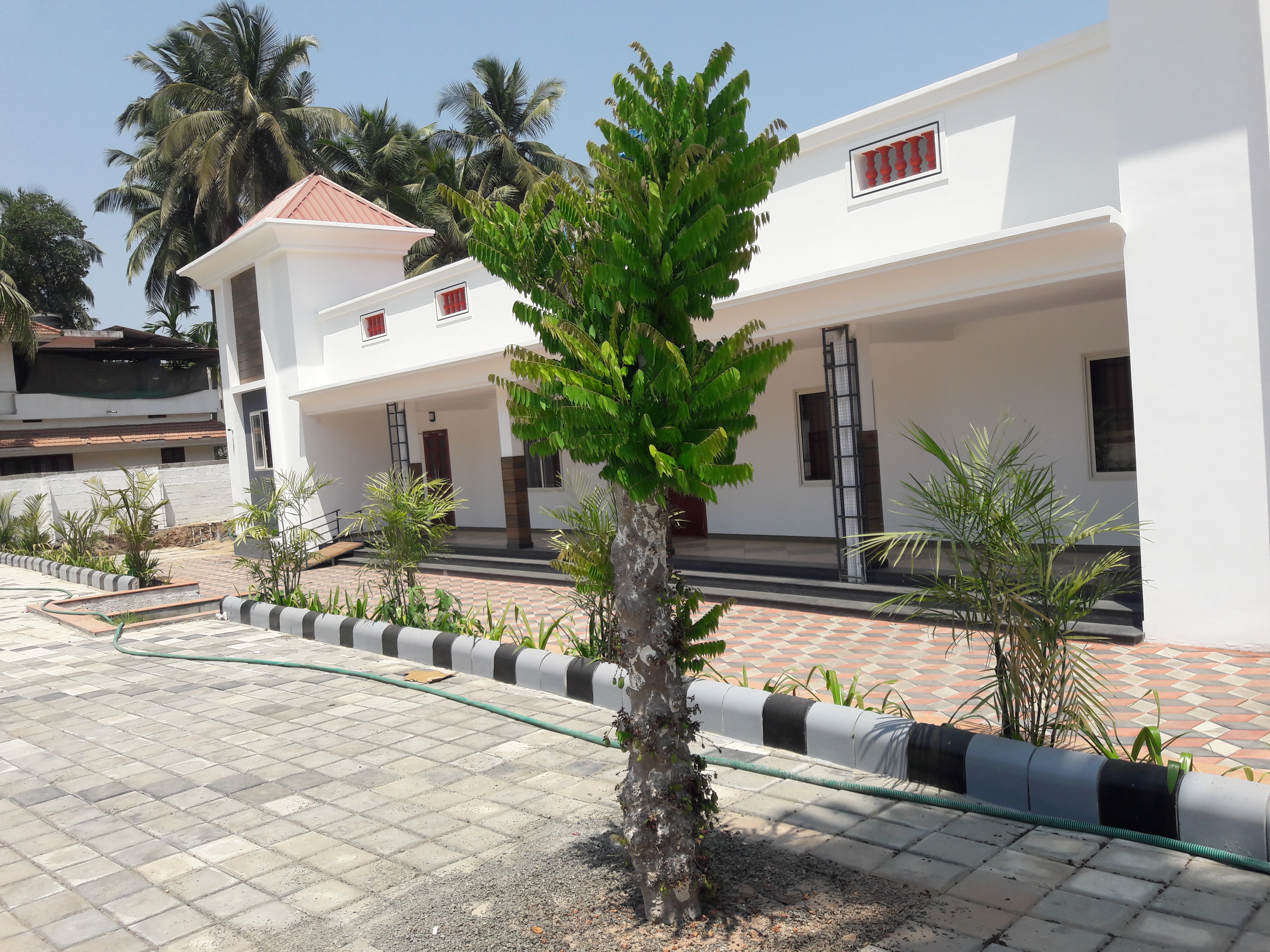
Bilimbi tree after replanting

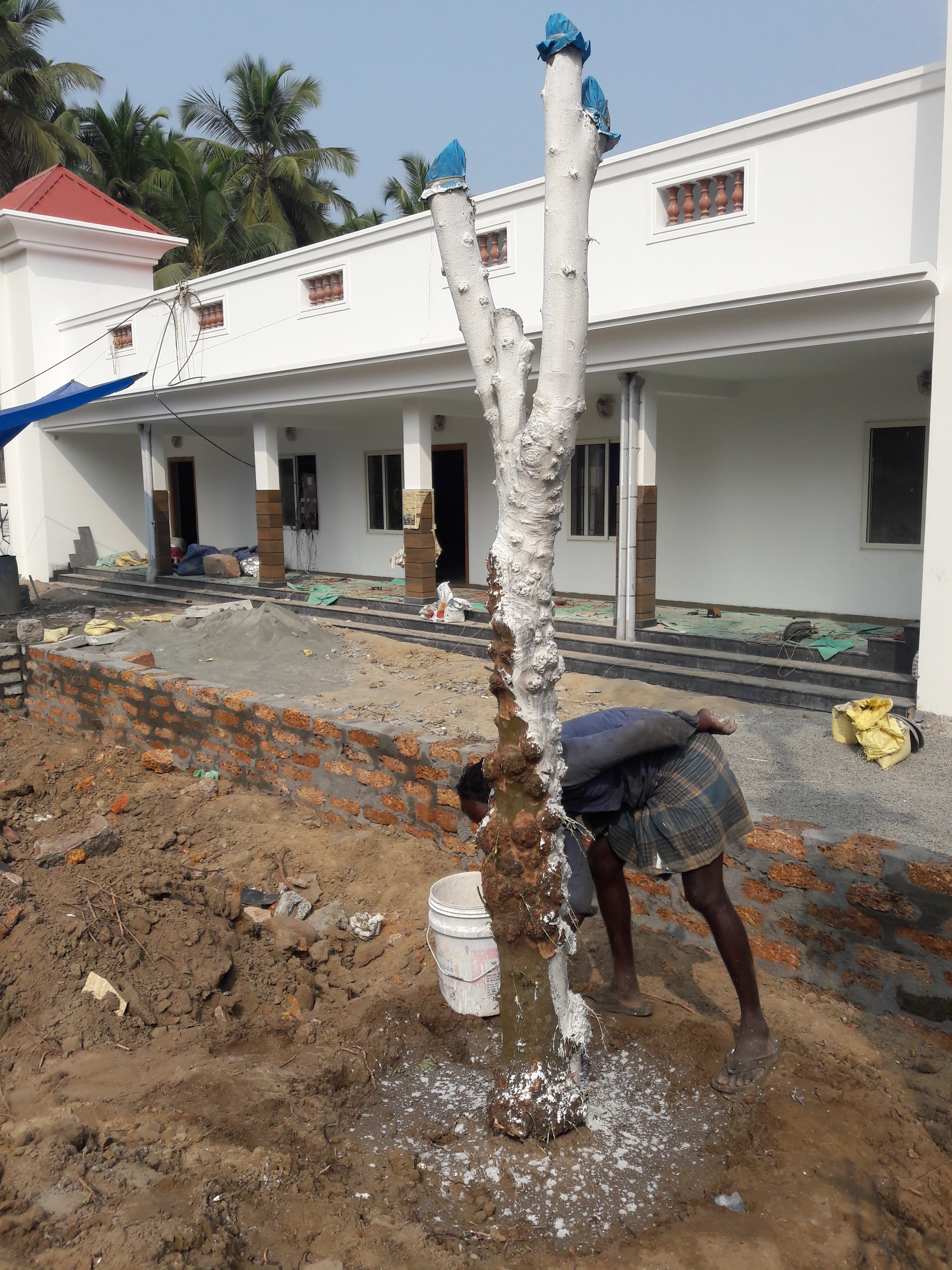

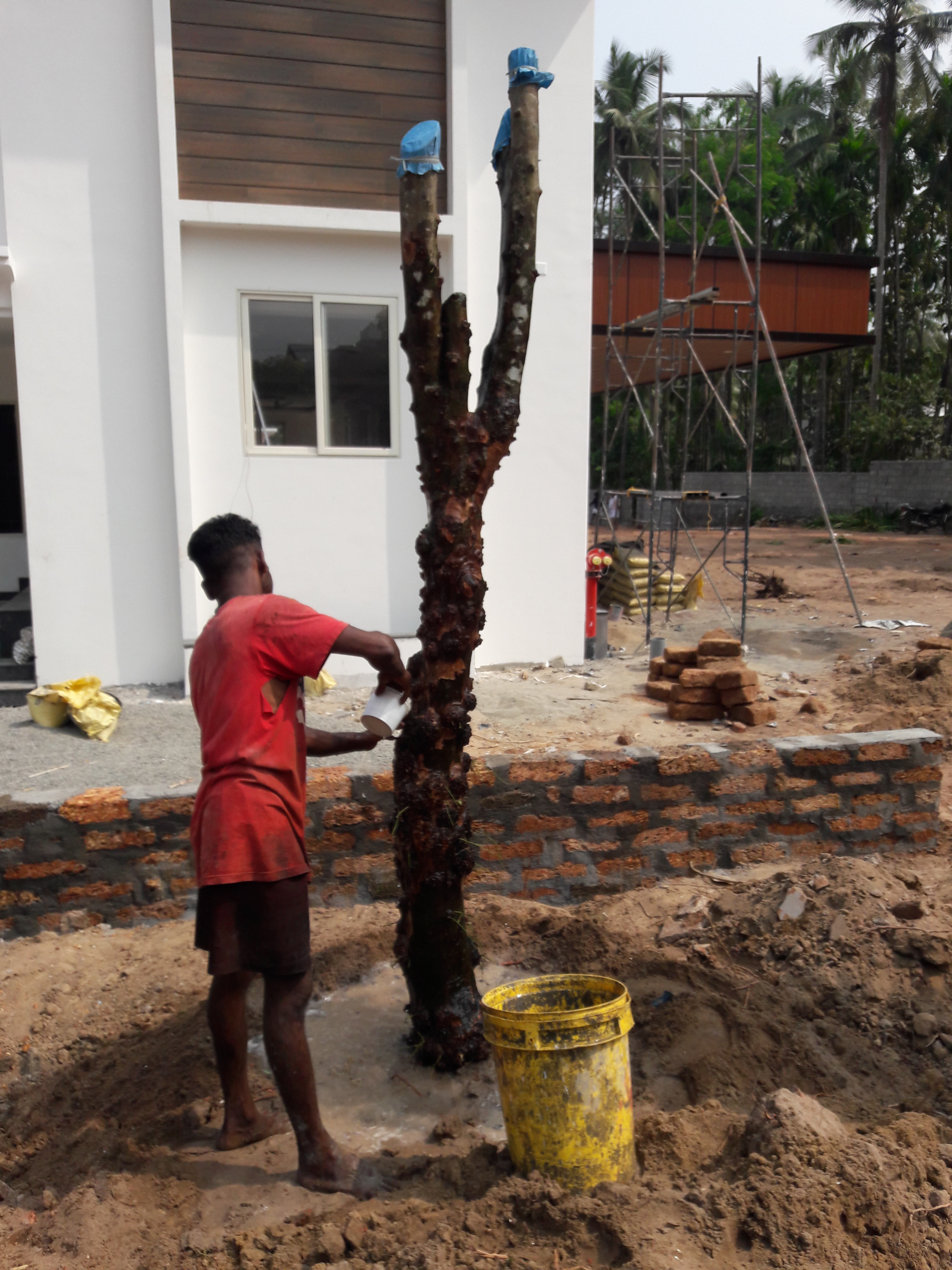

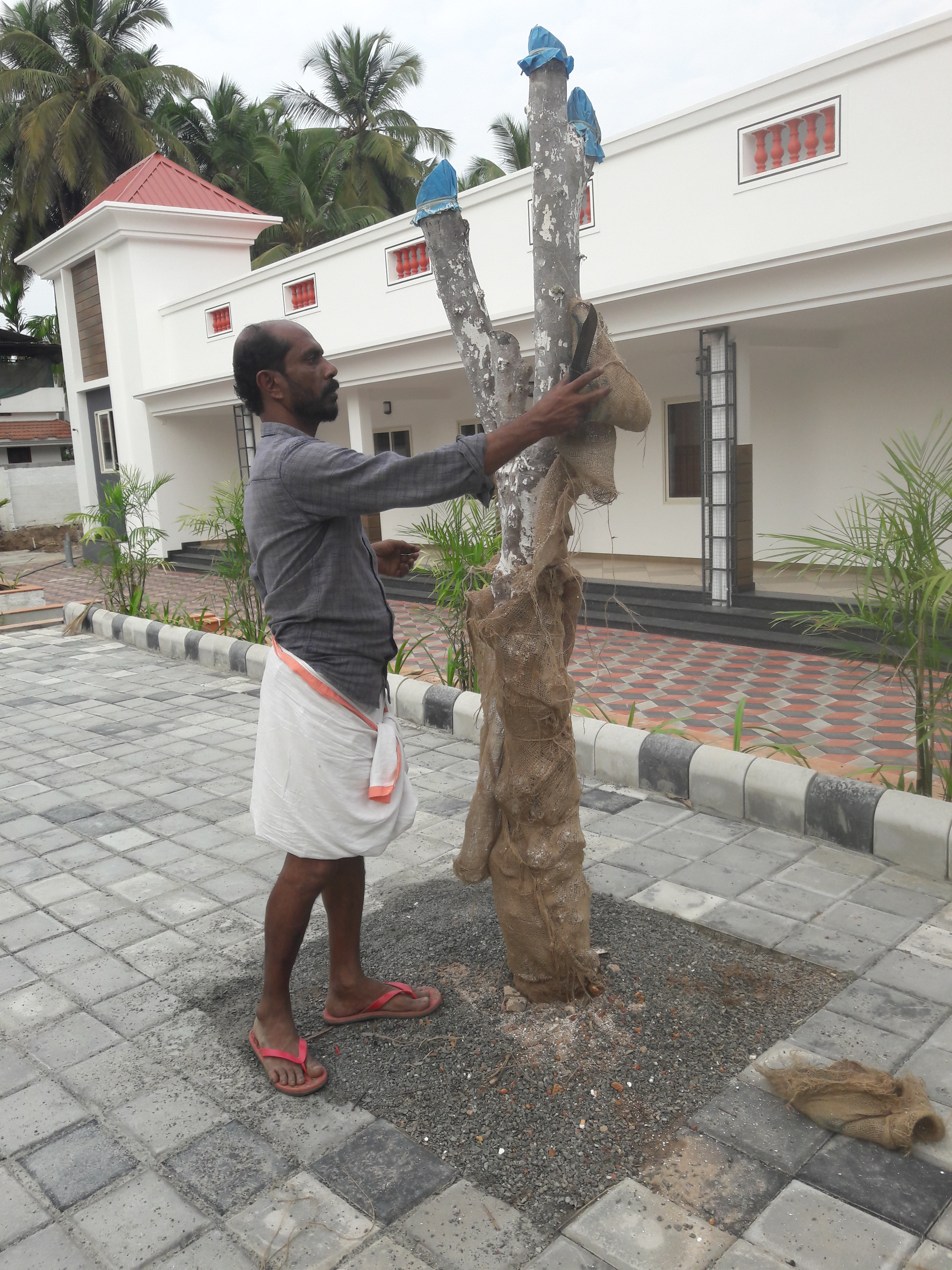

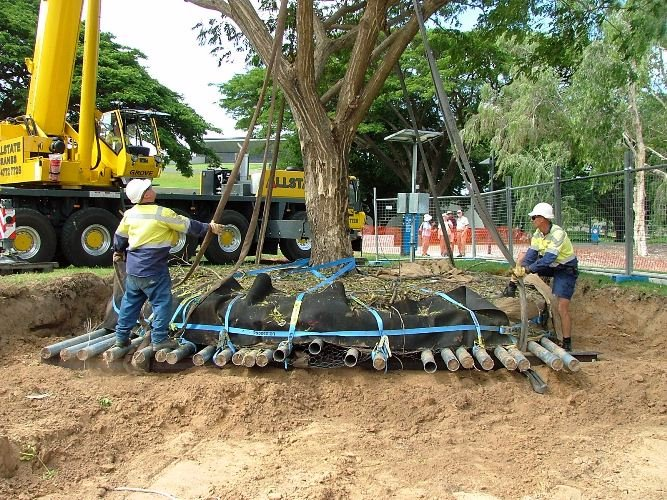
Tree transplanting in Australia

== See also ==
- Seed tray
- Transplant experiment
