= Lawn sweeper =

Garden tool that collects lawn debris in a hopper

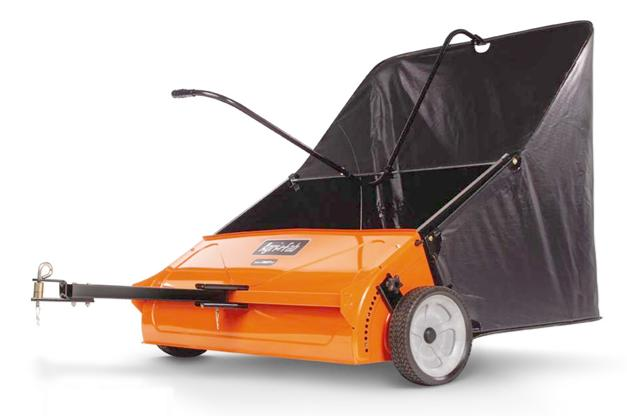
Tow lawn sweepers can be attached to lawn tractors

A lawn sweeper, also known as a leaf sweeper or lawn brush, is a garden tool for the mechanical removal of debris, such as fallen leaves, pine needles, twigs, grass clippings or litter, from a lawn or paved area. Lawn sweepers operate via a rotating brush mechanism that sweeps up the debris and deposits it in a collection hopper for disposal.

== Types ==
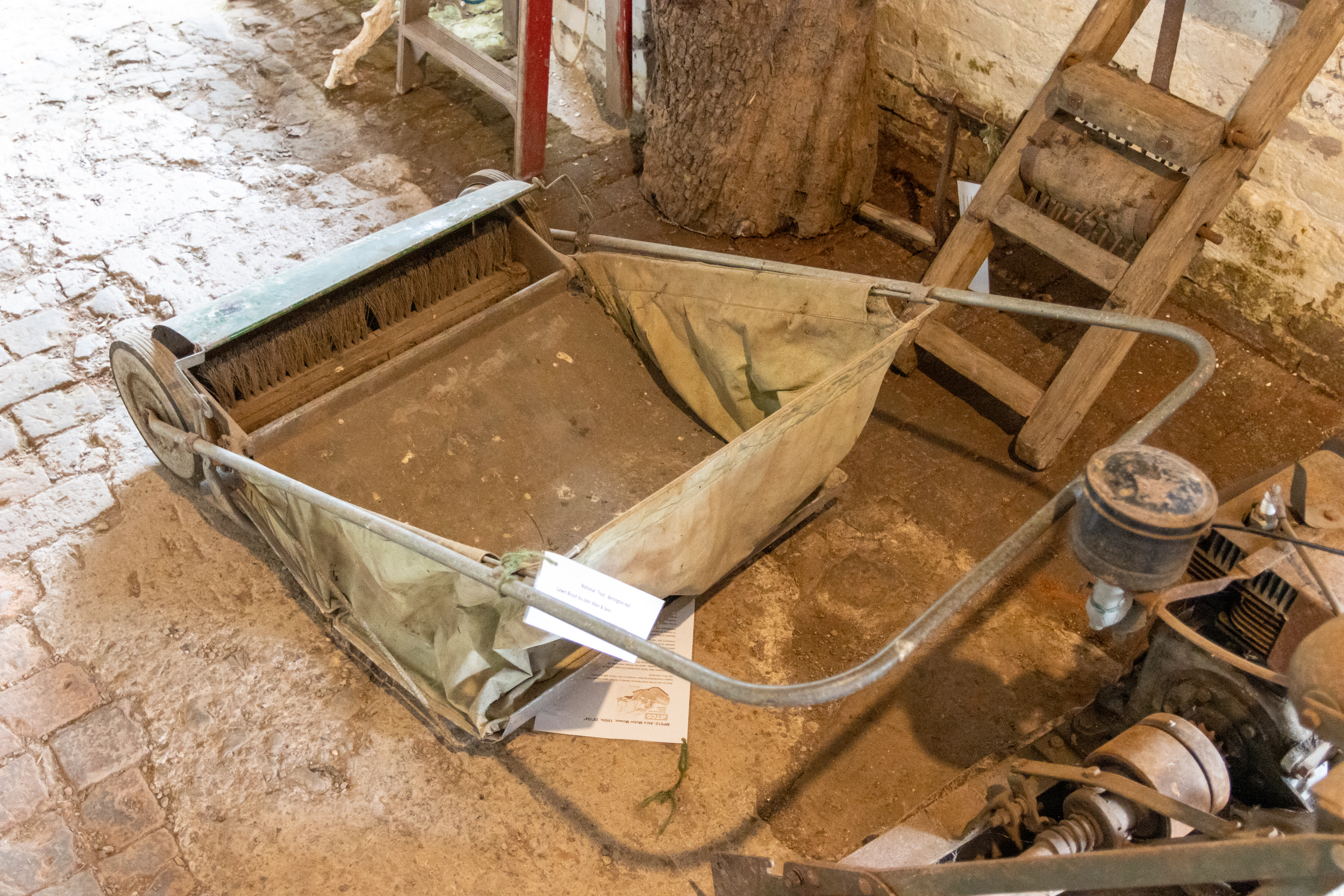
A lawn brush from c. 1957 at Berrington Hall

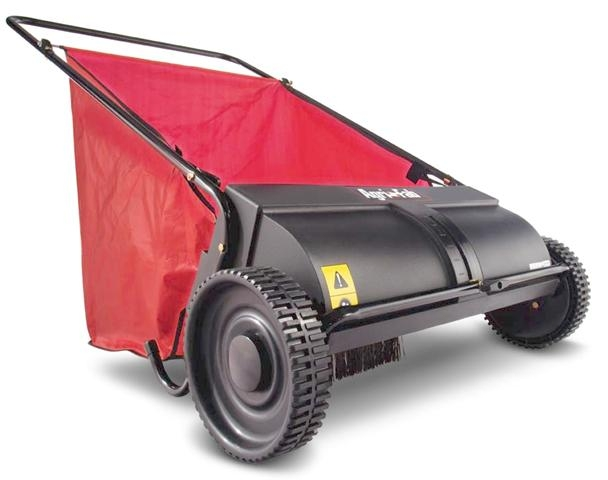
Push lawn sweepers are lightweight and ideal for smaller lawns

Push lawn sweepers, which resemble a simple wheeled manual lawn mower, are maneuvered and powered by hand. A forward pushing action transfers power from the wheels to the brush mechanism via a gearing system, causing it to rotate, and the debris is picked up and transferred to a bag or hopper mounted on the machine. Powered lawn sweepers resemble push lawn sweepers, but the brush mechanism is powered by a gasoline or electric motor. Tow lawn sweepers are towed behind a vehicle, such as a garden tractor or ATV and are designed for use in larger areas. They are generally wider and have greater hopper capacities than push and powered lawn sweepers.

== Alternatives ==
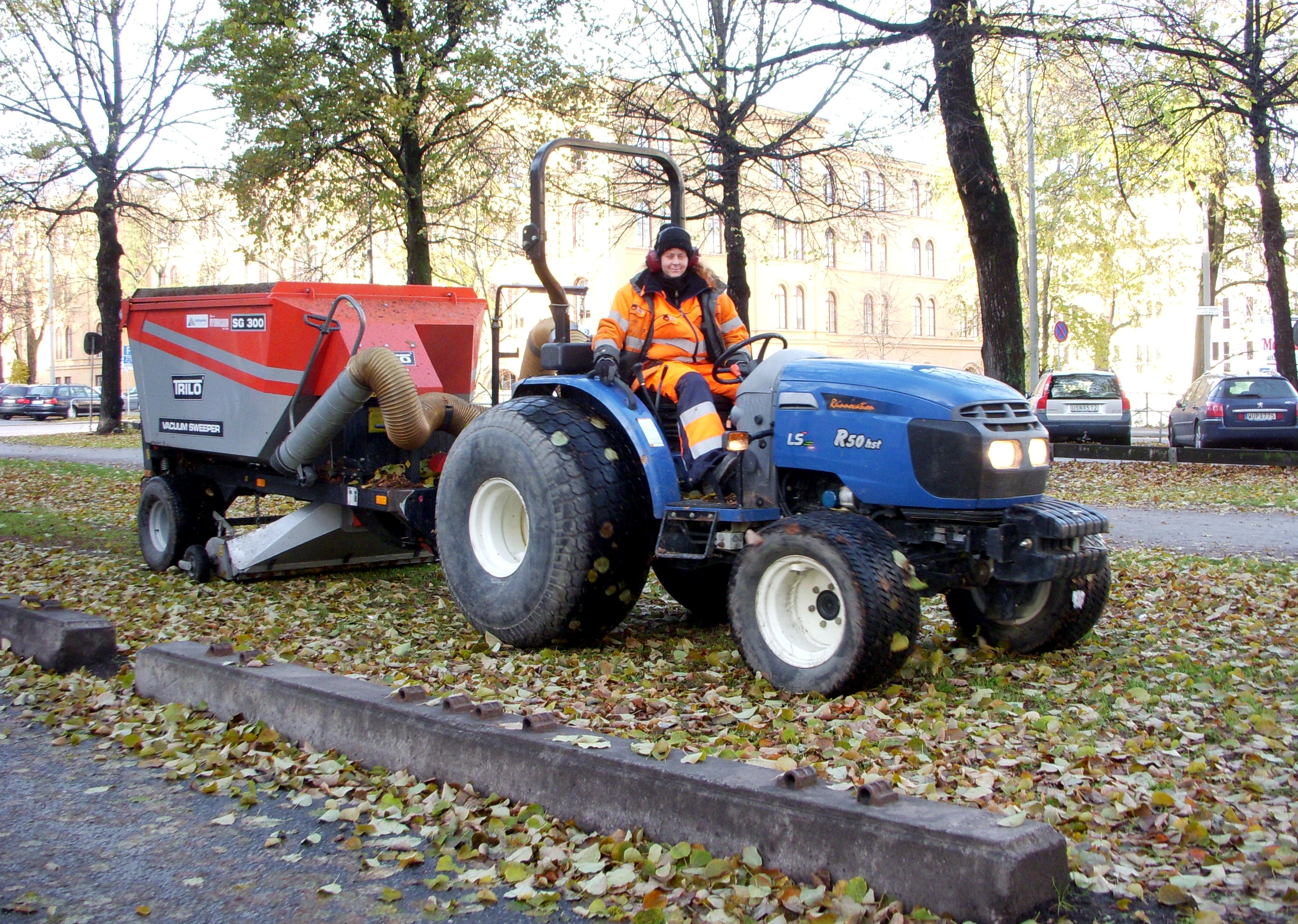
Vacuum sweeper towed by a tractor in Sweden

Lawn sweepers are an alternative to raking or the use of leaf blowers and garden vacuums. They are also an alternative to lawn mower baggers or grass baggers which are generally more expensive and have a smaller capacity.
