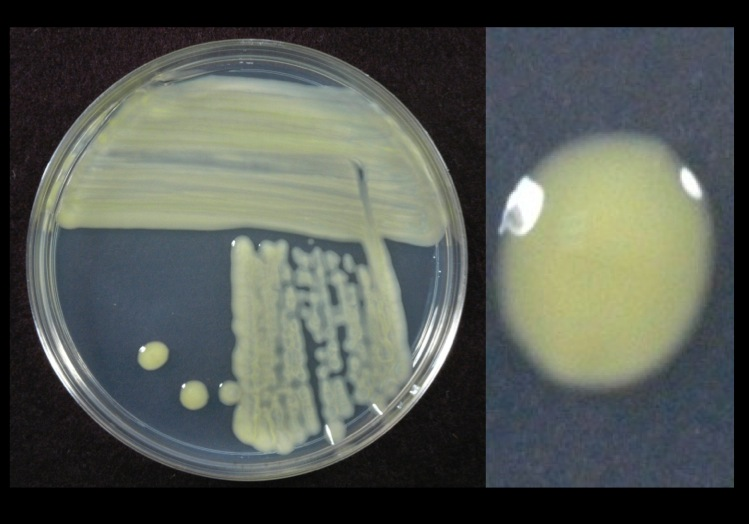
- Xanthomonas translucens on SPA media

Scientific classification
- Domain: Bacteria
- Phylum: Pseudomonadota
- Class: Gammaproteobacteria
- Order: Xanthomonadales
- Family: Xanthomonadaceae
- Genus: Xanthomonas
- Species: Xanthomonas translucens
- Variety: X. t. pv. graminis

Trinomial name
- Xanthomonas translucens pv. graminis

= Bacterial wilt of turfgrass =

Xanthomonas translucens pv. graminis

Bacterial disease of golf course turf

Bacterial wilt of turfgrass is the only known bacterial disease of turf. The causal agent is the Gram negative bacterium Xanthomonas translucens pv. graminis (syn. X. campestris pv. graminis). The first case of bacterial wilt of turf was reported in a cultivar of creeping bentgrass known as Toronto or C-15, which is found throughout the midwestern United States. Until the causal agent was identified in 1984, the disease was referred to simply as C-15 decline. This disease is almost exclusively found on putting greens at golf courses where extensive mowing creates wounds in the grass which the pathogen uses in order to enter the host and cause disease.

== Hosts and symptoms ==
Creeping bentgrass (Agrostis stolonifera) and annual bluegrasses (Poa annua) are the makeup of most putting greens, as well as the preferred hosts of this pathogen. Specifically, Toronto (C-15), Seaside, and Nemisilla are the cultivars of creeping bentgrass most commonly affected. The bacteria enter the plant host and interfere with water and nutrient flow, causing the plant to look drought stressed and to take on a blueish-purple color. Additionally, symptoms of bacterial wilt of turf grass include yellow leaf spots, tan or brown spots, water soaked lesions, elongated yellow leaves and shriveling of aforementioned blue or dark green leaves. Since putting greens are not a pure stand of turf, some grass blades may be resistant to the bacterium and thus remain unharmed while the surrounding turf dies, rendering the putting surface inconsistent and unsightly, especially at high-end golf courses.

== Disease cycle ==
The bacterium overwinters in diseased plants and thatch and is disseminated by water through rain splash, or mechanically by mowers, hoses, other gardening equipment, and golf shoes. The pathogen can also be present in the host at planting in infected sprigs, sod, or plugs. Unlike fungi, bacterial plant pathogens are unable to wound or mechanically probe plant hosts on their own. Instead, these pathogens enter through wounds inflicted on plants through verticutting, cultivation, sand, or through natural openings such as stomates and hydathodes. Once they have successfully entered and colonized the plant host, bacterial plant pathogens commandeer the nutrient and water supplies of plant cells to aid their own reproduction. In a study conducted by Zhou et al. (2013), the time between inoculation and wilt of host plants was found to depend heavily on temperature, with higher temperatures resulting in more rapid host decline. The researchers report the time between inoculation and wilting of host plants to be between 9–42 days. Bacteria can also spread to the roots of nearby plants underground. Within the plant host itself, bacteria spread by multiplying through binary fission and taking over more and more of the host by simply increasing their numbers.

== Environment ==
Prolonged periods of wetness and/or poorly drained soils, followed by warm, sunny days and cool nights constitute the optimal conditions for bacterial wilt. Thus, transitions between spring and summer, and summer and autumn are usually accompanied by increases in bacterial wilt of turf grass as these seasonal changes, especially in the early fall, bring sustained rainfalls and longer, cooler nights. Bacterial wilt of turf grass has been reported in several regions of Illinois, as well as other Midwestern states such as Michigan, Ohio, and Wisconsin. Antiserum produced from an isolate of this pathogen in Illinois was found to have reacted to another such isolate from Europe, suggesting that the pathogen was brought over to North America from Europe. In fact, a survey of wheat and rye fields in Western Scotland demonstrated Xanthomonas campestris pv. graminis infection in 71% of the fields, with rye grass bearing the most infection. Meadow fescue from the same fields also demonstrated susceptibility to the pathogen under laboratory conditions, further pointing to Europe as the potential origin of this pathogen in the United States.

== Management ==
General biocides such as copper, Junction, or ZeroTol offer a potential solution to bacterial wilt of turf grass; however, such chemical control agents must be applied after every mowing which may be economically impractical and ultimately phytotoxic. If bacterial wilt is present of the golf course, the best option may be to designate a mower for use on infected greens only in order to prevent the spread of the pathogen to other greens. Other viable methods include simply limiting the number of wounds the plant incurs, thereby limiting entry sites for the pathogen. A simple example would be less frequent mowing. It has also been proven that the disease is most devastating in grass cut to a length of between 1/8 and 3/16 of an inch, but less so in grass over 1/4 of an inch in length or longer, which presents an additional argument for limiting mowing. Another example is limiting sand topdressing as this is also a very abrasive technique which can create small wounds which allow entry of bacteria into the plant.

A major factor complicating the control of Xanthomonas translucens is weather. While it is not possible to control the weather per se, a study found great decreases in pathogen efficacy at temperatures below 20 °C, suggesting that cooling measures may be effective in combating this pathogen.

Ideally, resistant strains of the host plant should be used to control such a plant pathogen; however, no resistant cultivars of turf grass have been identified to date. While no completely resistant cultivars exist, certain cultivars such as Penncross and Penneagle are more resistant to bacterial wilt and may thus reduce the need for frequent chemical applications and other cultural controls. Researchers are making gains towards the identification of resistant cultivars as evidenced by the finding that variation in genetic linkage groups 1, 4, and 6 accounted for over 43% of resistance among Italian rye grass.

A 1987 study found evidence of a possible biocontrol strategy for bacterial wilt of turf grass. The researchers found that antiserum to Pseudomonas fluorescens or Erwinia herbicola from hosts which have survived infections by the corresponding pathogens is capable of reducing wilt symptoms in turf grass caused by Xanthomonas translucens. The researchers did note, however, that while it is important to ensure the presence of a higher number of competing bacterial cells in order to reduce symptoms, one should take care to avoid over-infecting the host with a new bacterial pathogen.

Further gains towards host resistance were made in 2001 when researchers found that inoculation of meadow fescue during breeding with a single aggressive strain of the bacterial wilt pathogen greatly increased resistance in offspring, thereby demonstrating the potential of selective breeding to reduce bacterial wilt pathogenesis on turf and rye grasses.

== Importance ==
The impact of bacterial wilt of turf grass was perhaps most poignant when the disease destroyed the Toronto greens at the Butler National Golf Course in Illinois, just days before the PGA Western Open was set to take place there in 1980. While bacterial wilt of turf has plagued golf courses for many years, ongoing climate change may exacerbate its prominence, as the causal agent, Xanthomonas translucens, prefers the persistent rainfalls and cool nights which tend to accompany weather changes.
