= Thatch (lawn) =

Layer of organic matter that accumulates on a lawn around the base of grasses

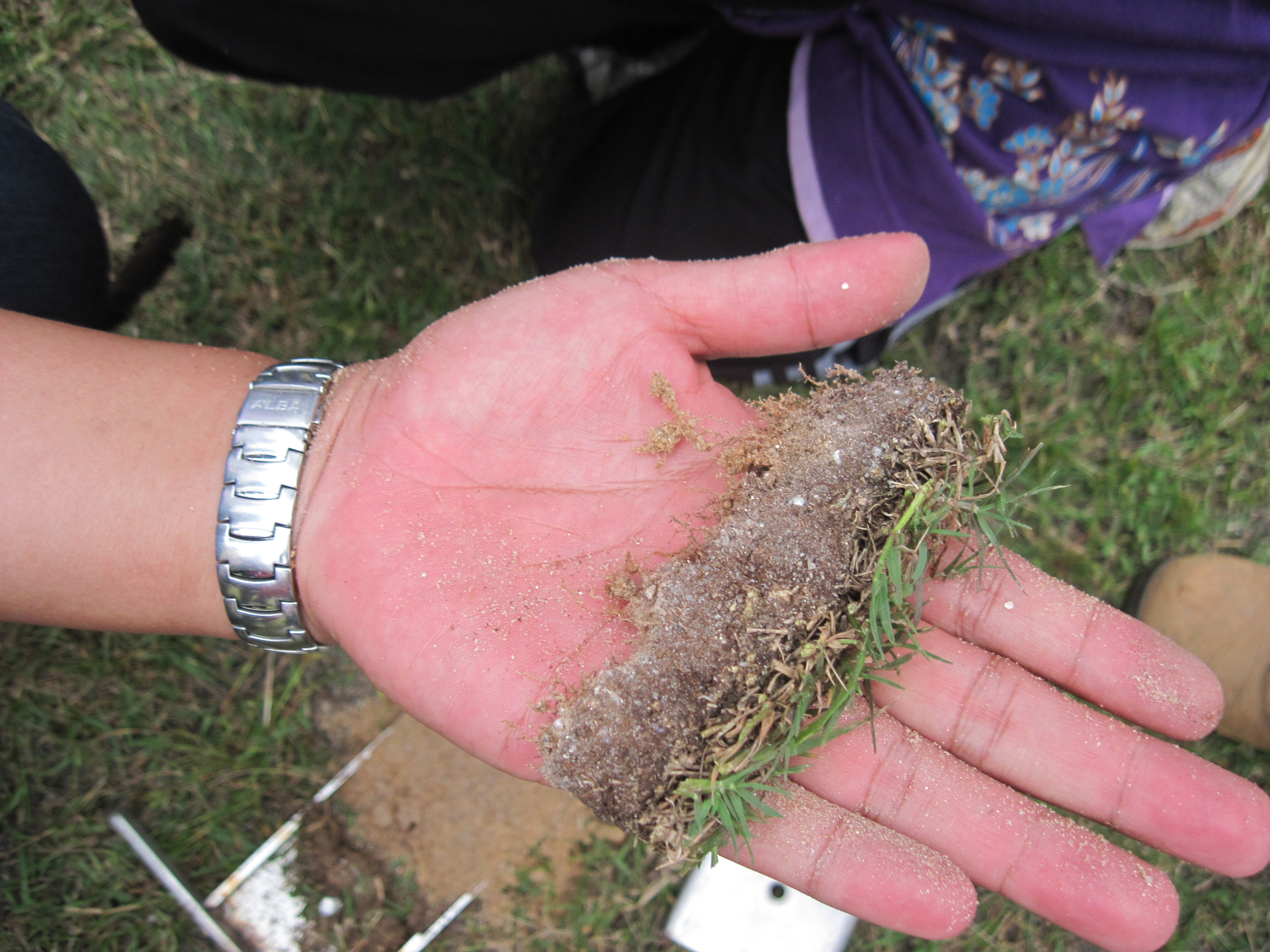
Turf cross-section showing thatch layer

In lawn care, thatch is a layer of organic matter that accumulates on a lawn around the base of the grass plants. Thatch is a combination of living and dead plant matter including crowns, stolons, rhizomes, and roots.

Grass clippings do not generally contribute to thatch buildup as they can be easily broken down by soil microorganisms. Thatch is composed of about 25% lignin, a complex organic polymer that is highly resistant to decomposition. Thatch buildup can be caused by several factors:

- Certain grass species are especially prone to thatch production
- Acidic soils may not be able to support sufficient populations of decomposing microorganisms
- Certain fungicides can stimulate excessive root and rhizome growth
- Application of insecticides may reduce earthworm activity, leading to decreased bioturbation
- Over-application of nitrogen fertilizers can stimulate excess growth as well as contribute to soil acidity

A small amount of thatch may provide a beneficial insulating effect against fluctuations in temperature and moisture. However, excessive thatch can cause root problems and lawn mower difficulties. A dethatcher may be used to remove thatch from a lawn.

== See also ==
- Plant litter – Dead plant material that has fallen to the ground
