= Hanging garden =

Artistic garden or small urban farm that is attached to or built on a wall

A hanging garden is a form of sustainable landscape architecture that can take several different forms, such as roof gardens, but is generally defined as a garden planted at a suspended or elevated position off the ground. These gardens are created with walls, fences, planted on terraces, growing from cliffs, or anything where the garden is not touching the earth. Space optimization is the main intention with the gardens, with aesthetics and providing cleaner air also commonly cited reasons. Hanging gardens are popular in urban environments with limited space such as in New York City or Los Angeles.

== History ==
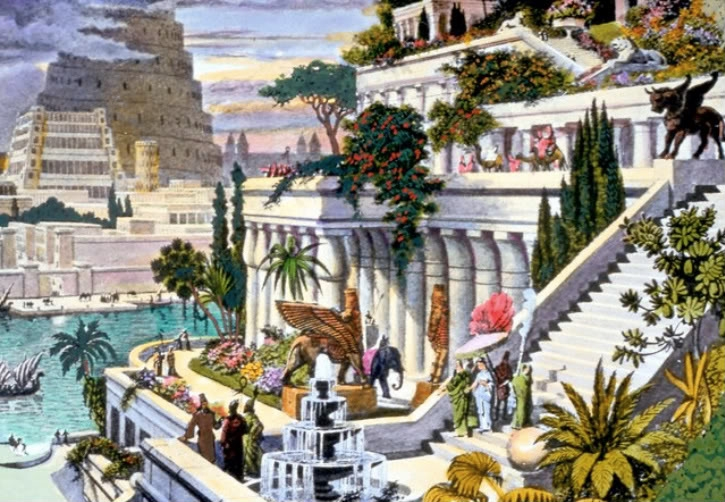
Hanging Gardens of Babylon

The first known instance of hanging gardens is the Hanging Gardens of Babylon. Considered one of the Seven Wonders of the Ancient World and the source of the term, the Hanging Gardens of Babylon are still of uncertain historicity. Another example of "reclaiming for nature the land occupied by the building" in the form of hanging gardens is the modernist Villa Savoye by the Swiss-French architect Le Corbusier, a project mentioned in his Five Points of Architecture.

== Modern ==
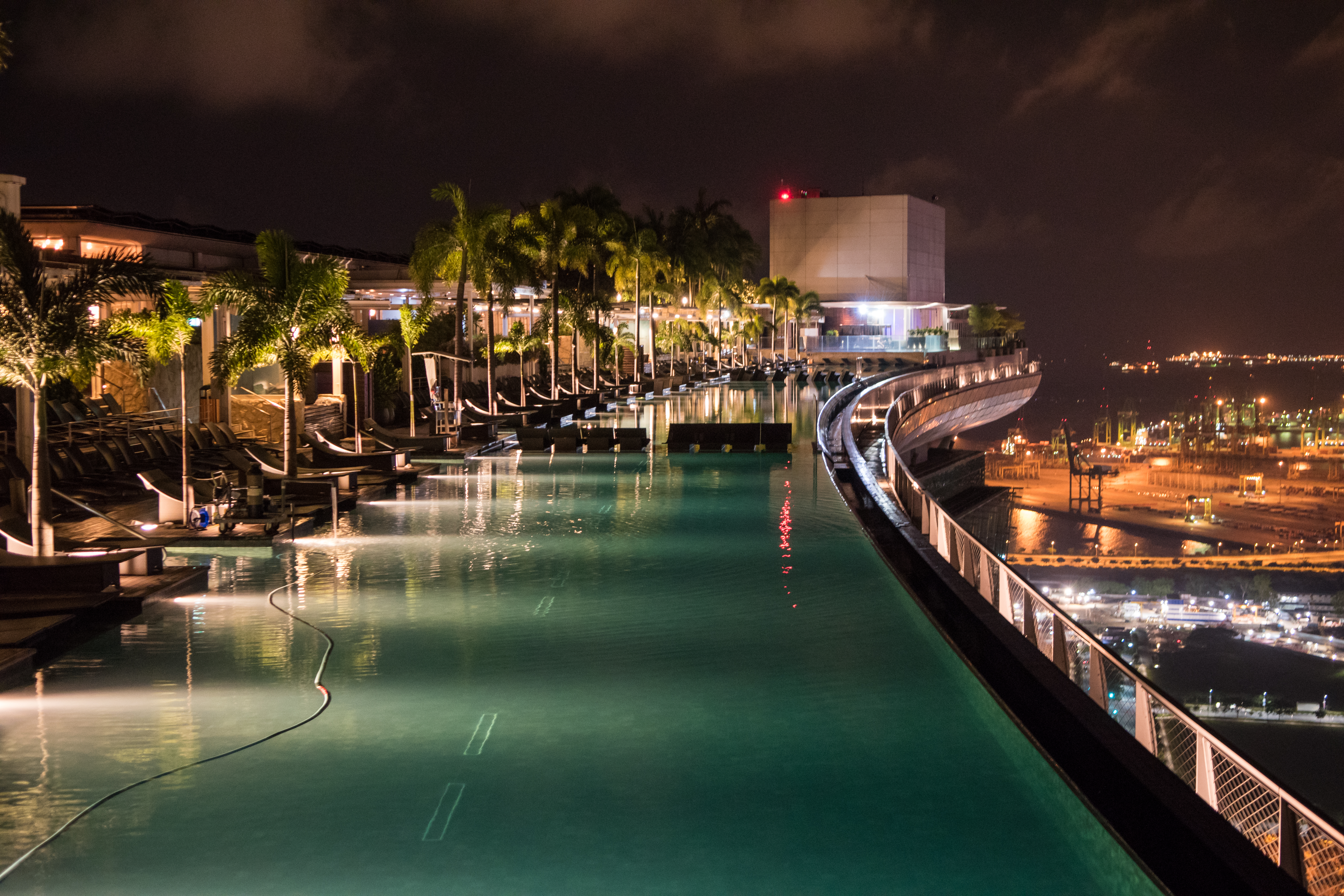
Modern hanging garden with rimless swimming pool, Singapore.

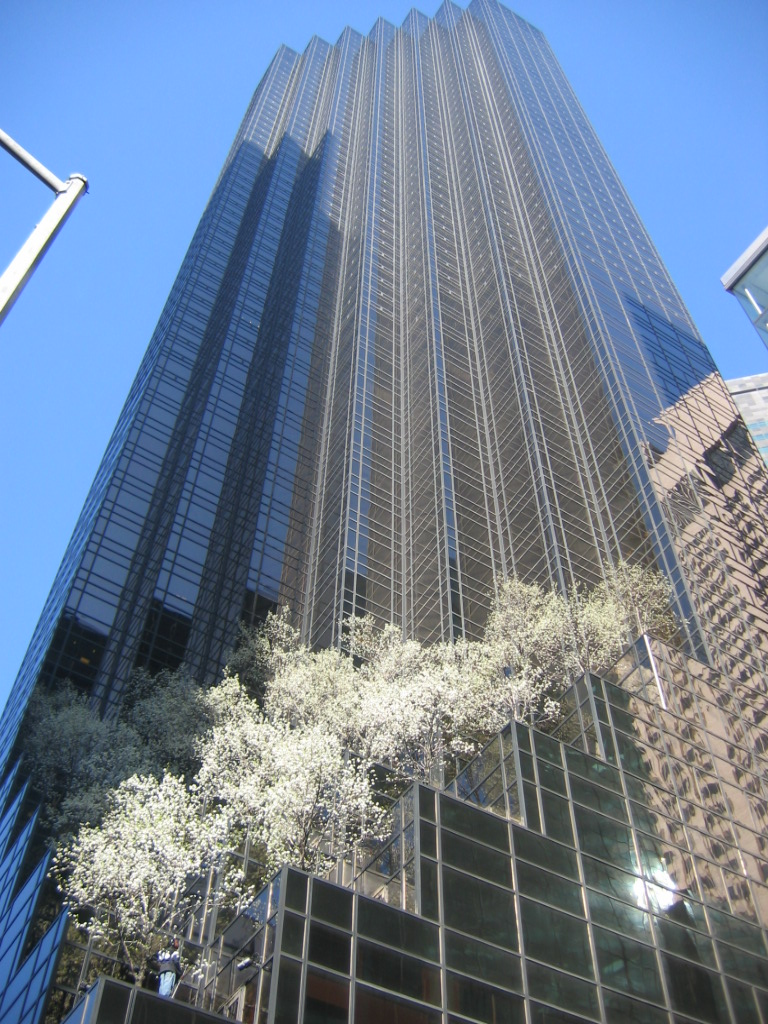
Trump Tower trees

In contemporary use, hanging gardens are a green wall on a ground level facade, a balcony, a terrace, or part of a roof garden of a home, or skyrise greenery with a residential, commercial, or government office building. During the present day, many differing types of hanging gardens can be found. Perhaps the most well known hanging garden would be the one attached to the Trump Tower, where occasionally trees will be planted in each section of the slanted side of the building. Oakland Museum, located in Oakland California, also embraces the hanging gardens and roof gardens with their Great Lawn. The lawn is welcome to all who visit, also allowing the rooftop patio of the museum to be host to concerts and events.

Vertical farms are another version of hanging gardens that have become much more common within the last decade, usually being grown indoors and stacked on top of each other to take up the least horizontal space. These have some practical advantages over standard gardens as well, such as being grown with soilless systems such as hydroponics and aquaponics. These gardens also have less worry about the environment they're being grown in, as the environment can be produced and curated to whatever is needed.

== Products ==
Prefabricated modular hanging wall garden systems have been developed and are on the market internationally. Hanging pots as well as structures like trellises can easily be bought at a local hardware store or supermarket, making setting up a personal hanging garden relatively easy and accessible.

== Gallery ==
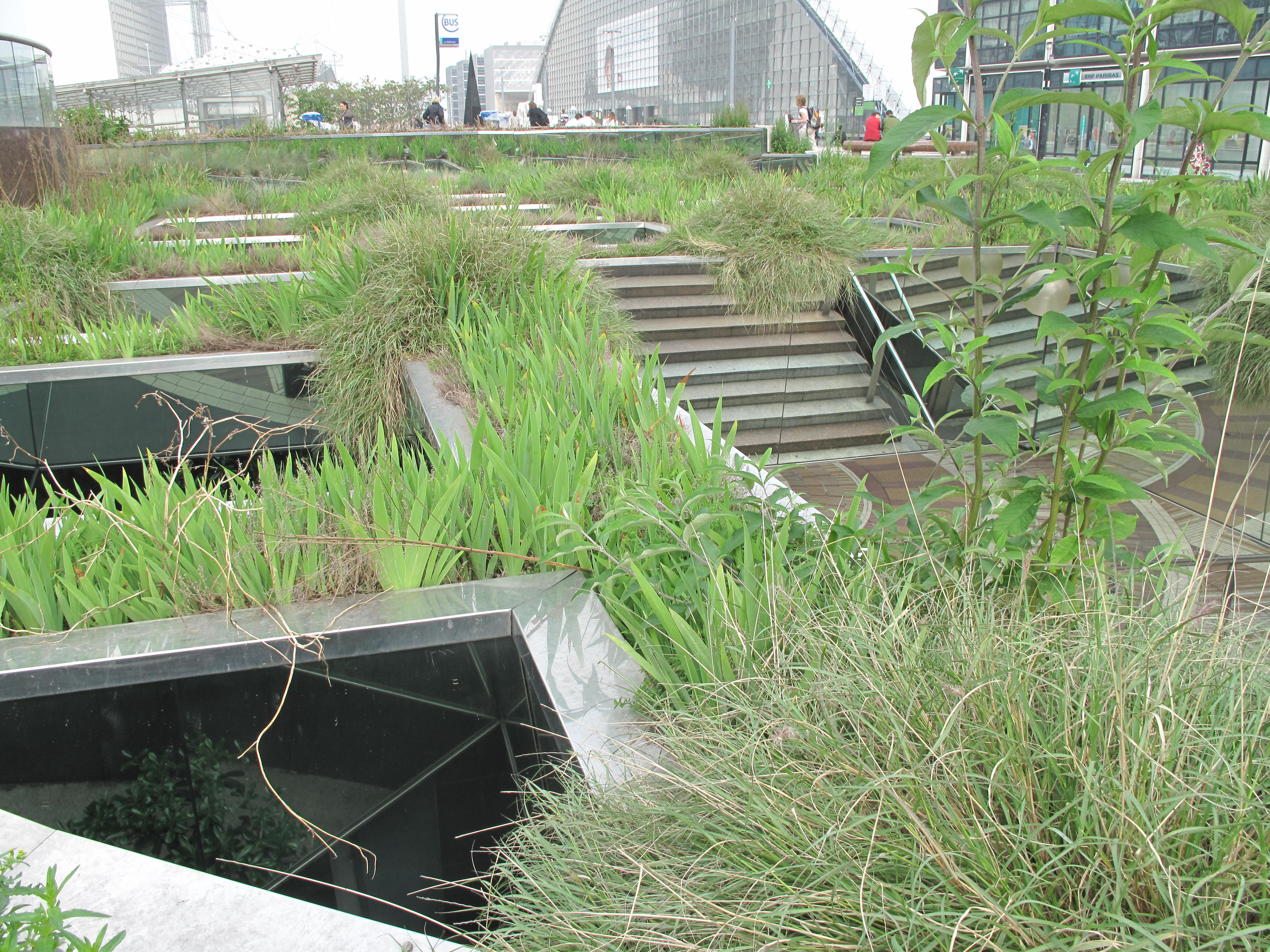
Hanging gardens at La Défense 1

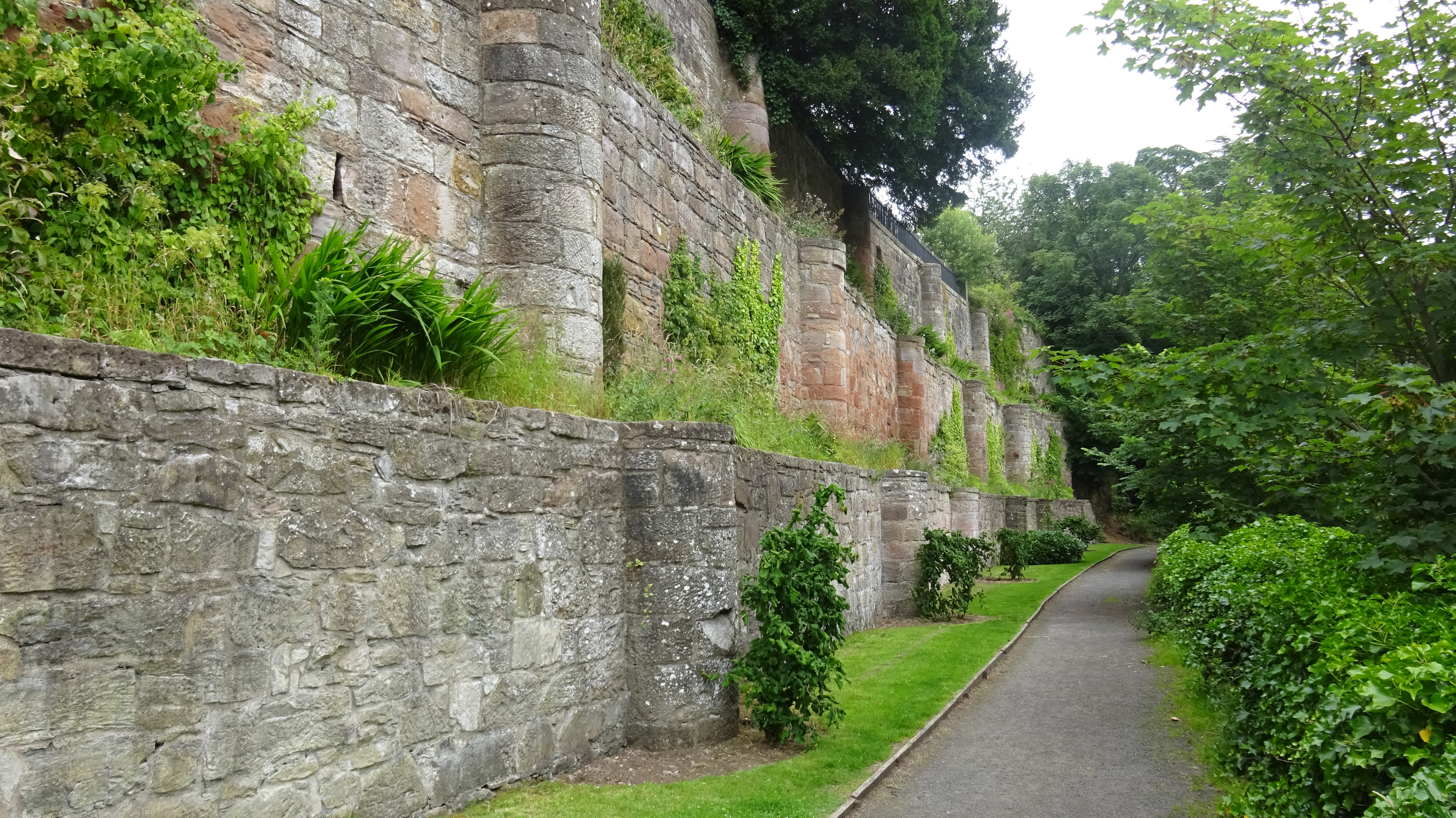
The Hanging Gardens, Auchincruive, South Ayrshire

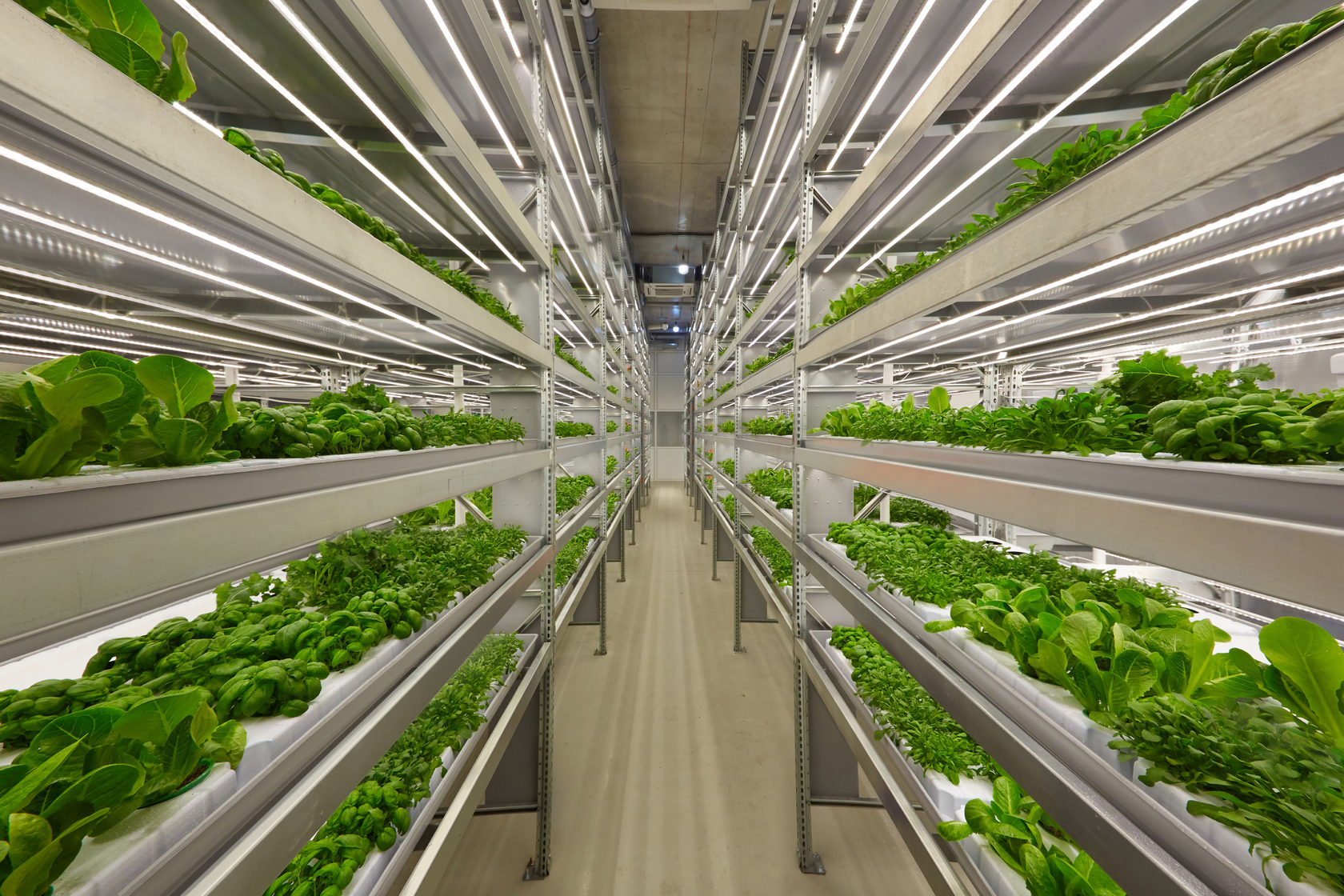
Vertical Farm

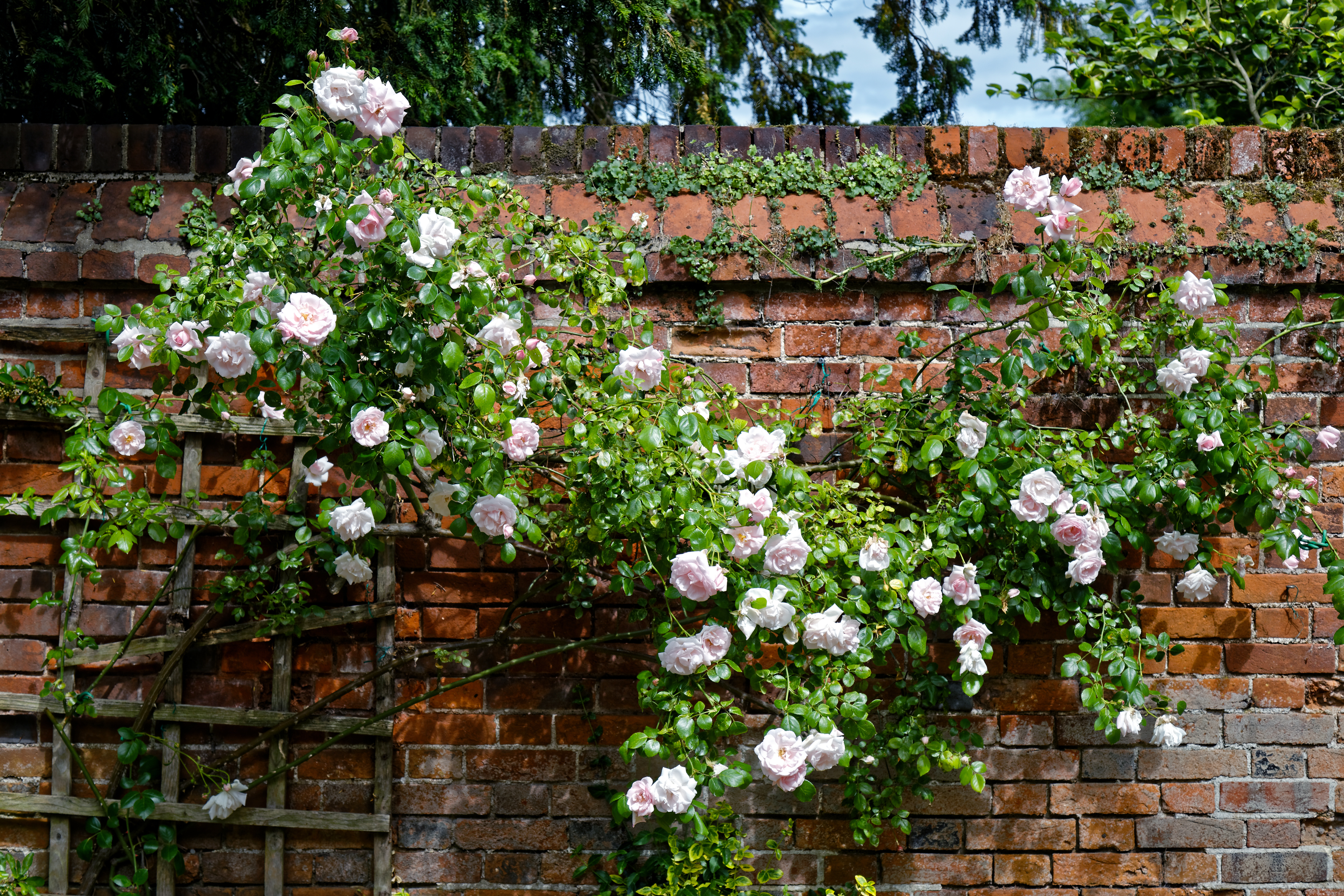
Trellis

== Sources ==
“Garden.” Oakland Museum of California (OMCA), 25 May 2023, museumca.org/on-view/garden/.

“Green Roofs and Rooftop Gardens - Calrecycle Home Page.” National Park Service, calrecycle.ca.gov/organics/compostmulch/toolbox/greenroofs/. Accessed 2 December 2023.

“The Hanging Gardens of Babylon: History, Legends, and More.” TheCollector, 28 November 2023, www.thecollector.com/hanging-gardens-babylon/.

“Hanging Gardens.” National Park Service, U.S. Department of the Interior, www.nps.gov/glca/learn/nature/hanginggardens.htm. Accessed 1 December 2023.

“Roof Garden.” TCLF, www.tclf.org/category/designed-landscape-types/roof-garden. Accessed 2 December 2023.

“Vertical Farming – No Longer a Futuristic Concept.” Vertical Farming – No Longer A Futuristic Concept : USDA ARS, www.ars.usda.gov/oc/utm/vertical-farming-no-longer-a-futuristic-concept/. Accessed 2 December 2023.

Wright, Richardson. The Story of Gardening: From the Hanging Gardens of Babylon to the Hanging Gardens of New York. Dover, 1963.

== See also ==
- Urban agriculture
- Container gardening
- Sustainable planting
