= San Bernardino Valley Water Conservation Demonstration Garden =

Coordinates: 34.1831°N 117.3240°W

- Interactive map of San Bernardino Valley Water Conservation Demonstration Garden
- Type: Botanical garden
- Location: California, U.S.

The San Bernardino Valley Water Conservation Demonstration Garden is a public teaching-research garden with just over an acre of plantings and displays that showcase water conservation through a series of themed gardens and exhibits located at California State University, San Bernardino. While located on the Cal State campus in San Bernardino, the Garden was not built with any state resources. Rather, it was made possible by major gifts from three local donors: the San Bernardino Valley Municipal Water District (now called the West Valley Water District), the San Manuel Band of Mission Indians and the Inland Empire Resource Conservation District, with additional donations from a variety of smaller donors and in-kind contributions of labor, supplies and expertise.

== History ==
About two years in the planning and building, the San Bernardino Valley Water Conservation Demonstration garden is a partnership between the university, its Water Resources Institute (WRI) and several community partners who were seeking to educate San Bernardino Valley residents about ways to lower their outdoor water consumption and offer research opportunities to the WRI.

A state mandate adopted in 2009 compels urban water supplies to achieve a 20 percent per capita reduction by 2020. One way to do this is by replacing irrigated grass with water-wise landscaping, but there is a lack of knowledge about planning, building and maintaining these landscapes, along with the misconception that saving water on landscapes limits homeowners to cacti. That is not the case, and the demonstration garden is a colorful testament to the variety of looks available.

== See also ==
- List of botanical gardens in the United States
- Xeriscaping
- Sustainable gardening
- California State University, San Bernardino
