= Loyola Hall (Seattle University) =

Building in Seattle, Washington, U.S.

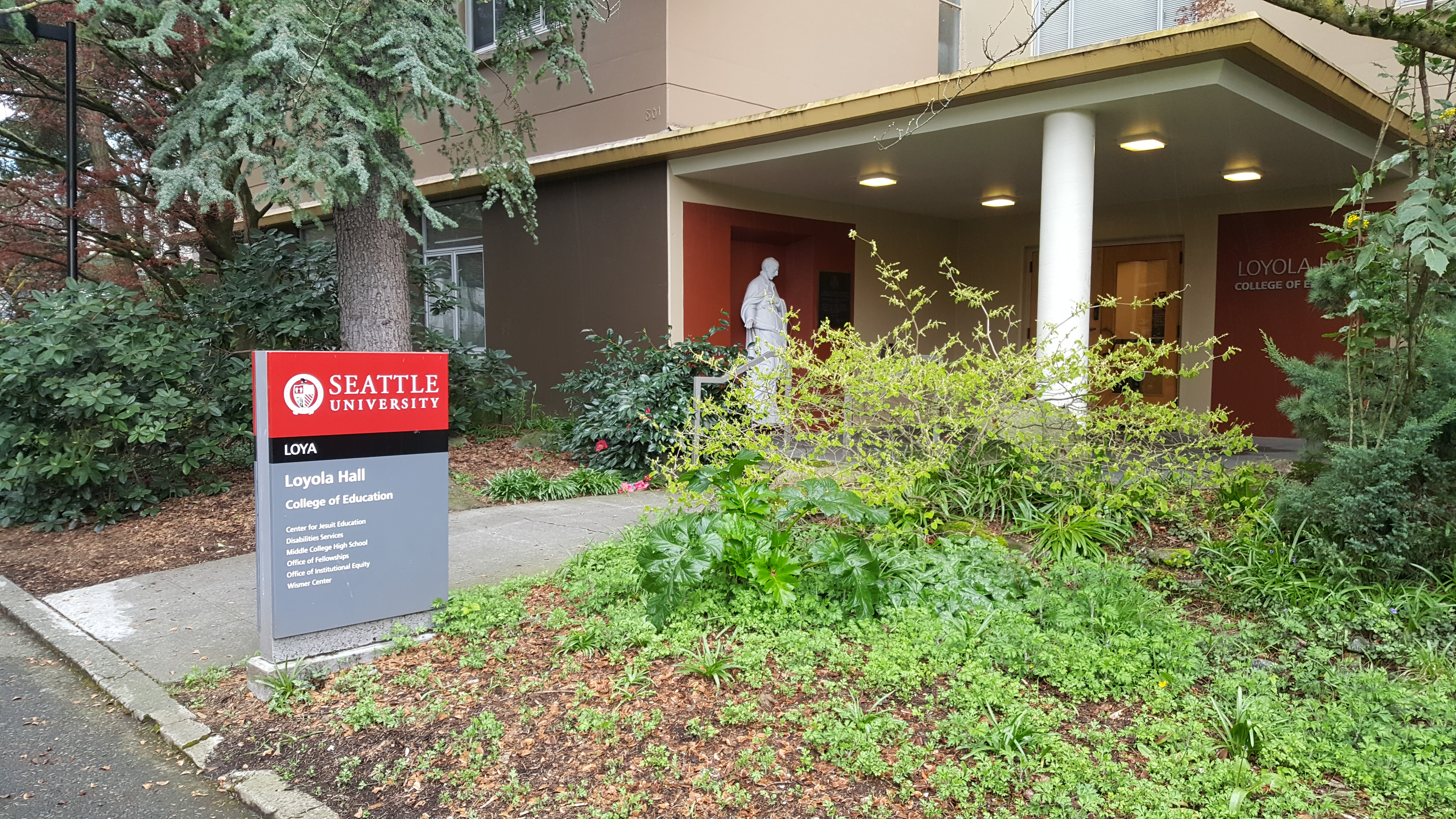
- The building's exterior, 2022
- Interactive map of the Loyola Hall area

General information
- Location: Seattle, Washington, United States
- Coordinates: 47°36′34″N 122°19′11″W

Loyola Hall is a building on the Seattle University campus, in the U.S. state of Washington.

== Description and history ==
The approximately 43,600 square foot structure was built during 1954–1955, dedicated in 1956, and renovated in 1994. Initially built as a Jesuit housing facility, the building houses the College of Education, Middle College High School, the Office of Institutional Equity, and the Disabilities Services office (as of 2016).

Daily mass started being served at the building in 1956. On May 6, 1972, a bomb explosion damaged the building's windows. In 2008, the James Ciscoe Morris Biodiversity Garden was dedicated outside the building to commemorate Morris' sustainable gardening program in his favorite spot on campus.

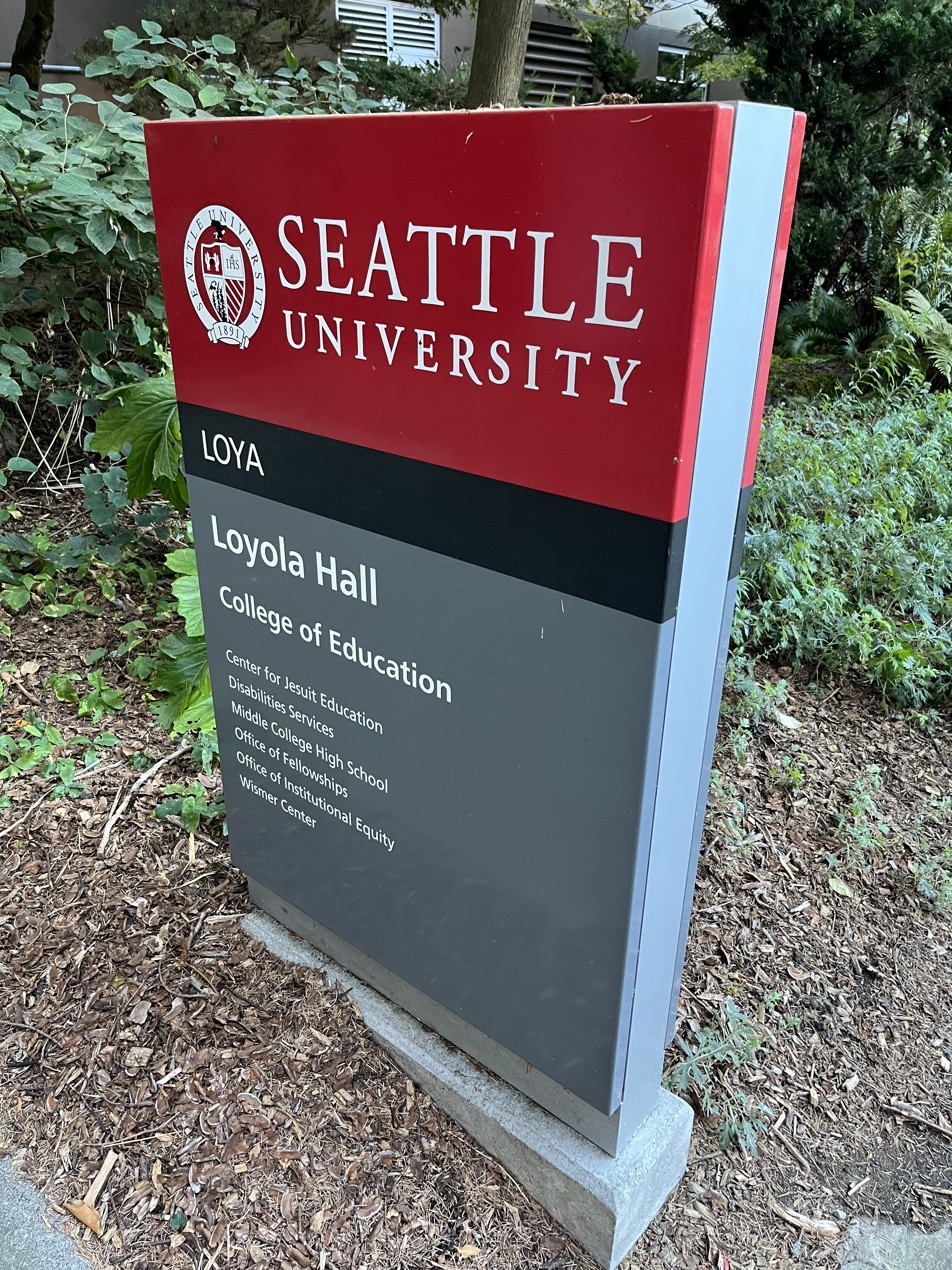
Sign

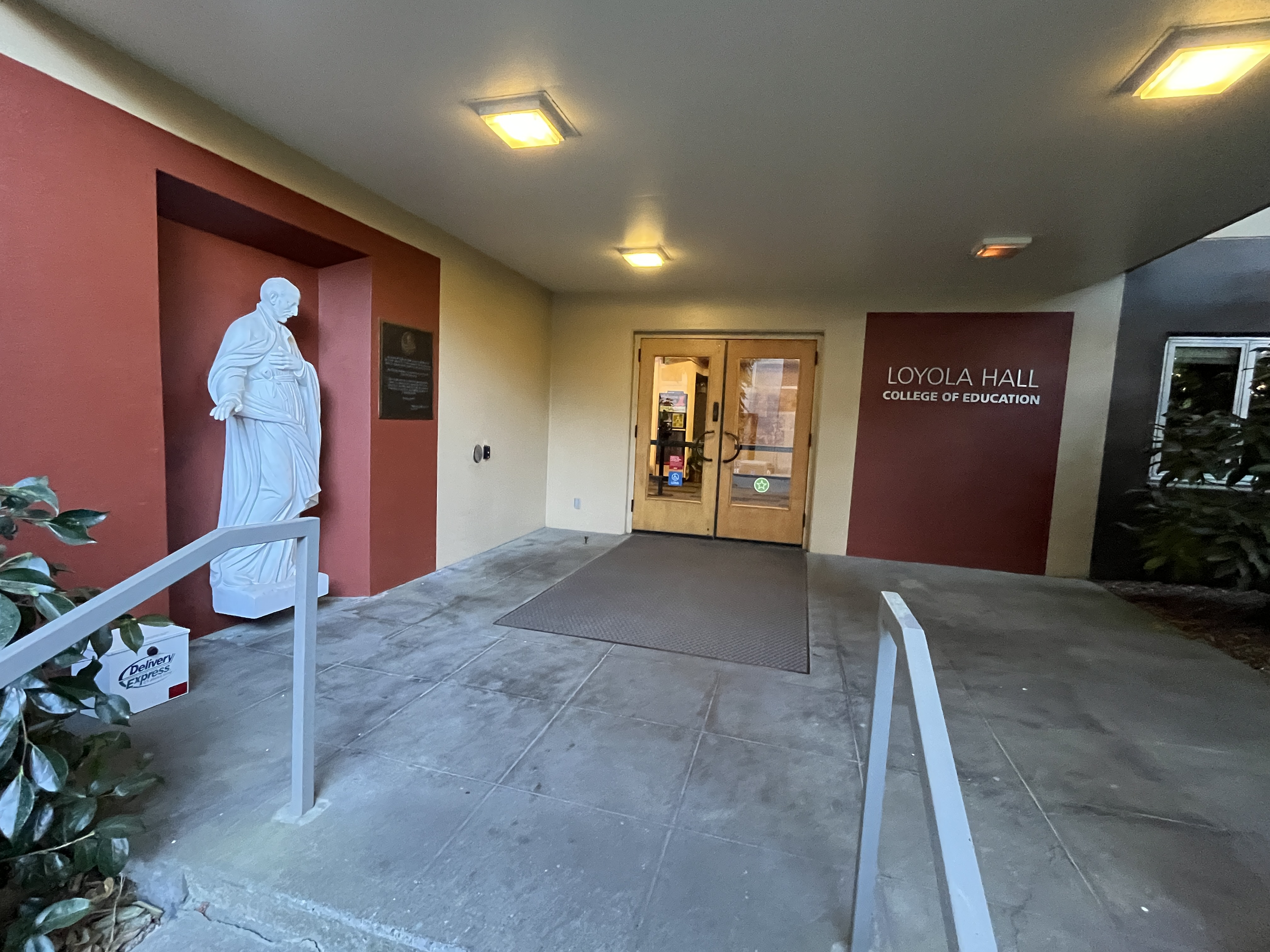
Entrance

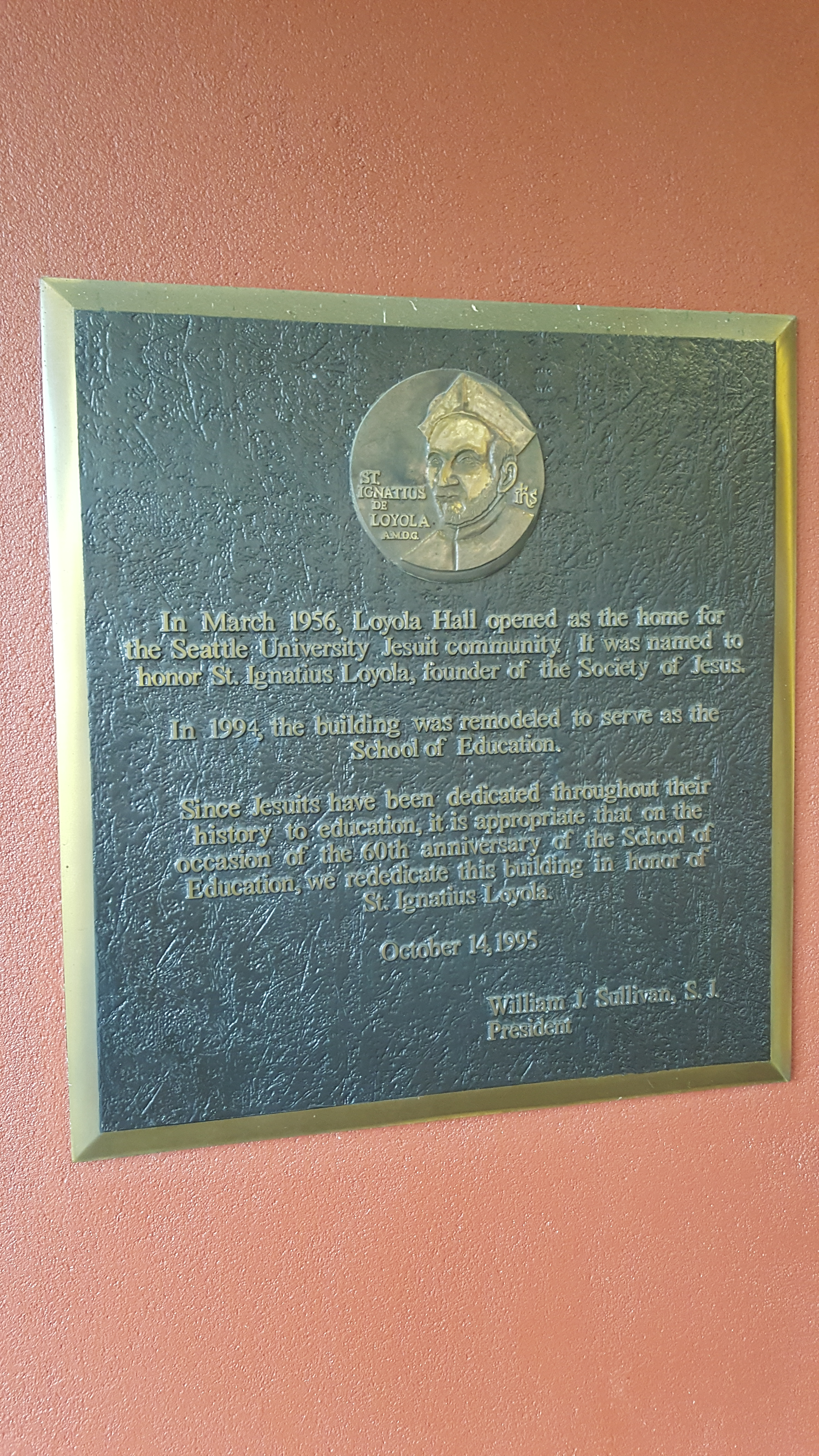
Plaque

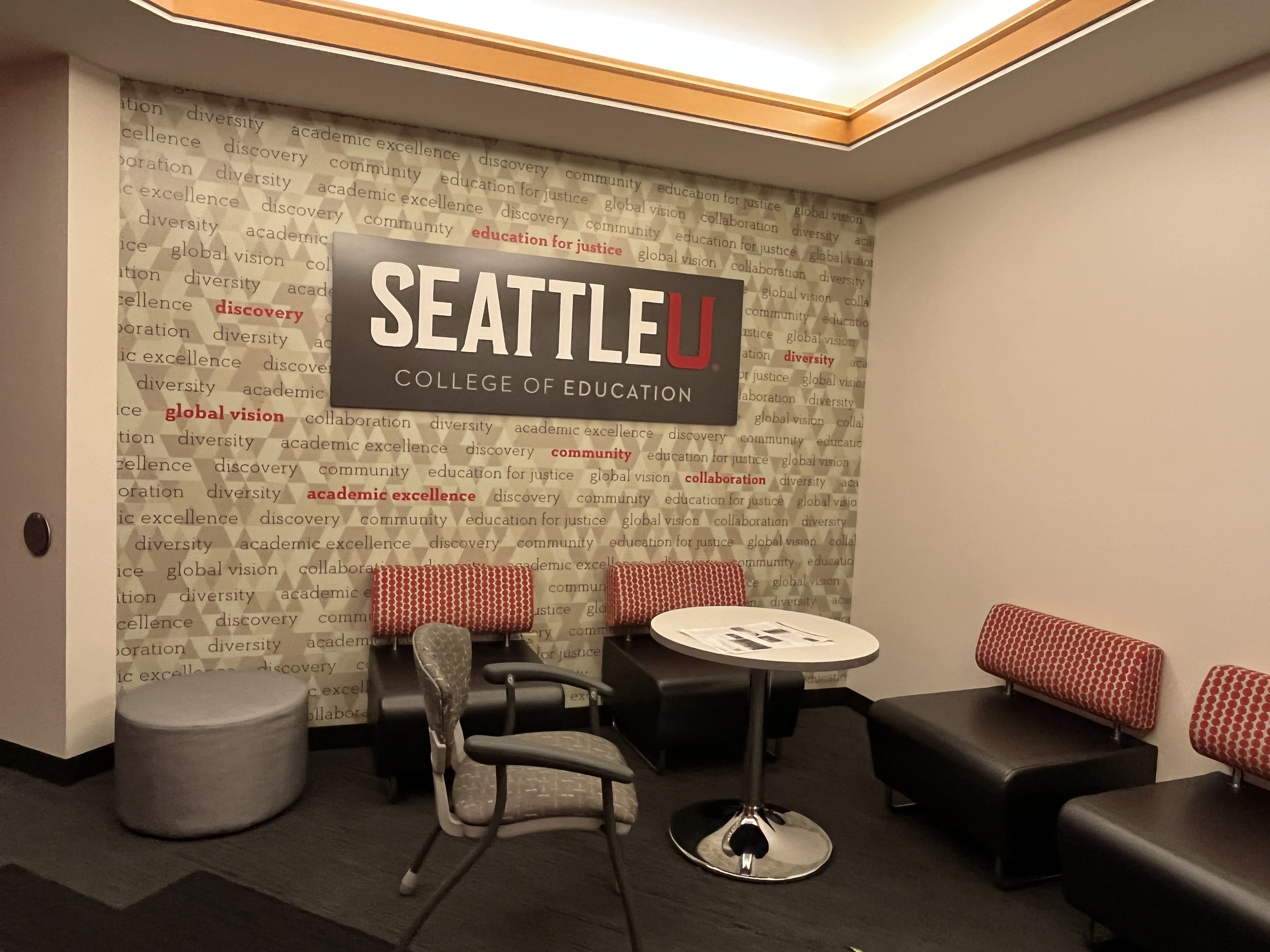
Interior
