= Sustainable planting =

Agricultural philosophy

Sustainable planting is an approach to planting design and landscaping-gardening.

== Practical examples ==
- When creating new roads or widening current roads, the Nevada Department of Transportation will reserve topsoil and native plants for donation.
- The Grain for Green Program in China pays farmers to convert their retired farmland back into forests or other natural landscapes.

== See also ==
- Sustainable landscaping
- Sustainable gardening
- Sustainable landscape architecture
