= Manure tea =

Organic alternative to chemical fertilizers

Manure tea is the product of the manure of livestock being steeped in a bag submerged in water. This tea is used for the fertilization of crops. This is an organic alternative to chemical fertilizers and is a more sustainable practice of fertilization.

The process of making manure tea begins with the collection of manure. Manure of all different types of livestock may be used. The next step in the production of manure tea involves fermenting and curing the manure that has been collected. This process involves storing the manure in a location that is free from any type of run-offs, and lies below direct sunlight. Once stored, this manure must be checked on and stirred up on a regular basis to allow the even curing of the material. Once this manure is cured properly, destroying any potentially harmful pathogens, it may be transferred into a steeping mechanism of choice. For example, placing the manure in gunny sacks, then completely submerging these bags into a bucket of water.

This manure is now steeped over a desired period of time, and spread over and directly onto crops once finished. Some methods of spreading this fertilizer include a watering can or an attachment placed on a hose. The remains of manure left in the gunny sack may also be spread as fertilizer around crops. The process of using manure tea as fertilizer is considered sustainable because it utilizes an otherwise wasted product such as the manure of livestock. It is also cost effective.
