= Sustainable gardening =

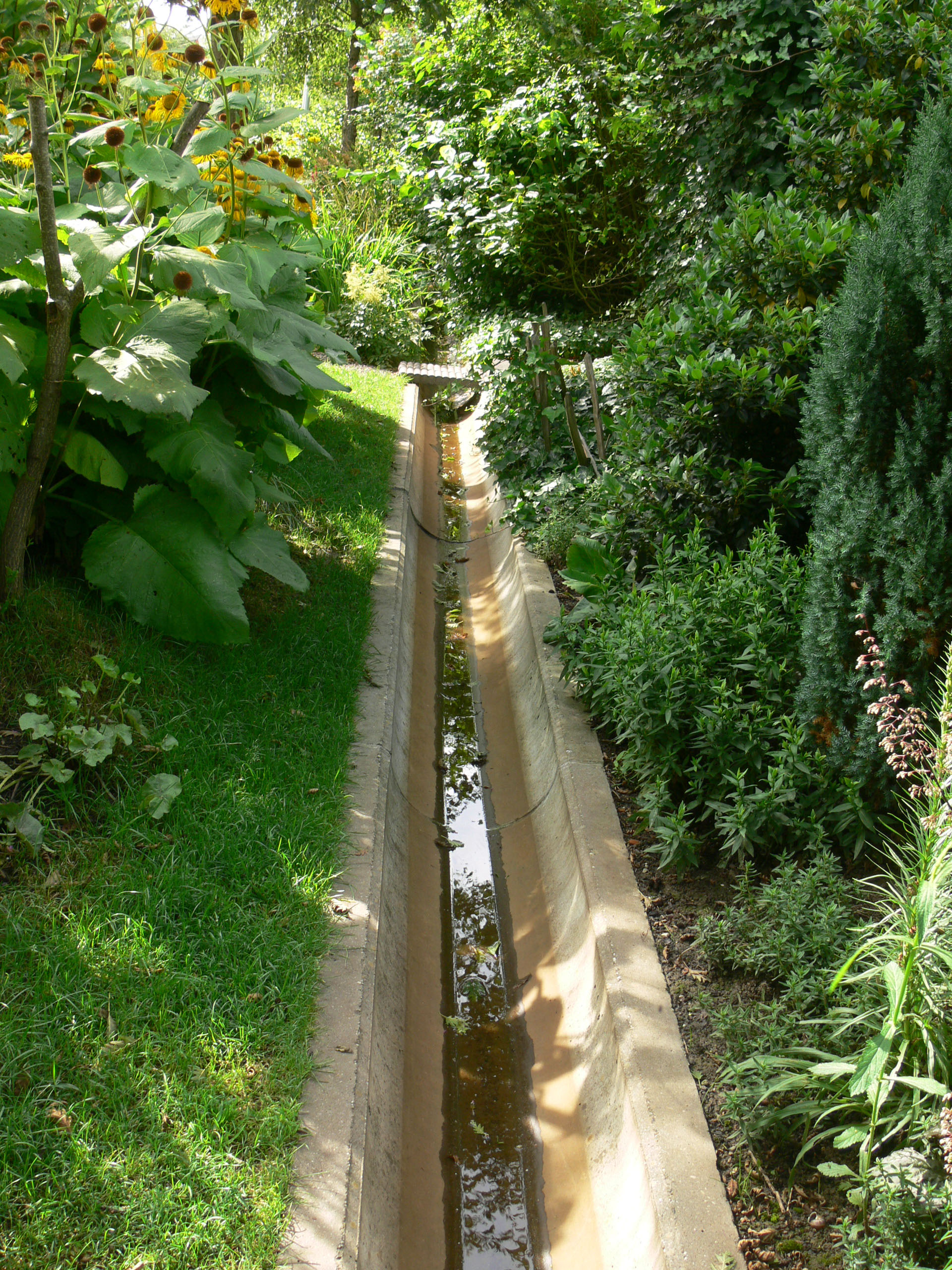
A water collector at the EVA Lanxmeer housing development in Culemborg, Netherlands

Sustainable gardening includes the more specific sustainable landscapes, sustainable landscape design, sustainable landscaping, sustainable landscape architecture, resulting in sustainable sites. It comprises a disparate group of horticultural interests that can share the aims and objectives associated with the international post-1980s sustainable development and sustainability programs developed to address that humans are now using natural biophysical resources faster than they can be replenished by nature.

Included within this are those home gardeners, and members of the landscape and nursery industries, and municipal authorities, that integrate environmental, social, and economic factors to create a more sustainable future. Benefits of sustainable gardening also include improved access to fresh foods and biodiversity in cities.[2][3]

== Sustainable Sites Initiative ==
The Sustainable Sites Initiative is a commercial accreditation body in USA which certifies landscapers and sites using guidelines and performance benchmarks for sustainable land design, for which their registered trademark can be earned after a fee. It was founded in 2005. Using the United Nations Brundtland Report’s definition of sustainable development as a model, it defines sustainability as:

...design, construction, operations and maintenance practices that meet the needs of the present without compromising the ability of future generations to meet their own needs

by attempting to:

...protect, restore and enhance the ability of landscapes to provide ecosystem services that benefit humans and other organisms.

There is no uniform national standard for a sustainable landscaping project in the USA. Sites are rated according to their impact on ecosystem services: The following ecosystem services have been identified:

- Microclimate regulation
- Air and water purification
- Water supply and regulation
- Erosion and sediment control
- Hazard mitigation
- Pollination
- Habitat functions
- Waste decomposition and treatment
- Global climate regulation
- Human health and well-being benefits
- Food and renewable non-food products
- Cultural benefits

=== Principles ===
Enhancement of ecosystem services is encouraged throughout the life of any site by providing clear design, construction and management criteria. Sustainability requires that environmental, social and economic demands are integrated. Guidelines supplement existing green building guidelines and include metrics (benchmarks, audits, criteria, indexes etc.) that give some measure of sustainability (a rating system) by clarifying what is sustainable or not sustainable or, more likely, what is more or less sustainable.

Impacts of a site can be assessed and measured over any spatio-temporal scale. Impacts of a site may be direct by having direct measurable impacts on biodiversity and ecology at the site itself, or indirect when impacts occur away from the site.

=== Site principles ===
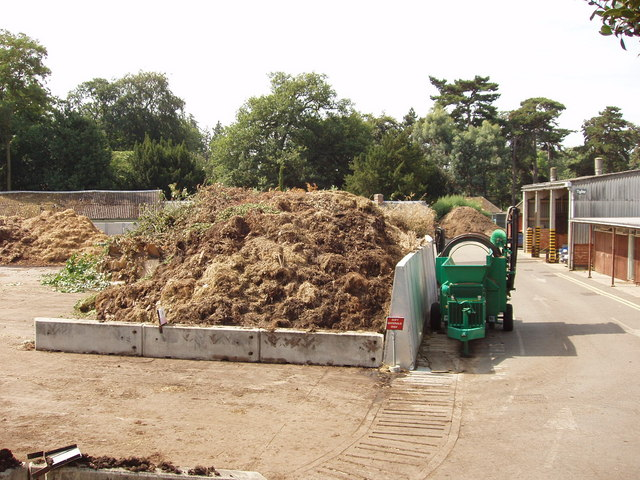
Compost heap at the Royal Botanic Gardens, Kew

The following are some site principles for sustainable gardening:

- do no harm
- use the precautionary principle
- design with nature and culture
- use a decision-making hierarchy of preservation, conservation, and regeneration
- provide regenerative systems as intergenerational equity
- support a living process
- use a system thinking approach
- use a collaborative and ethical approach
- maintain integrity in leadership and research
- foster environmental stewardship

== Measuring site sustainability ==
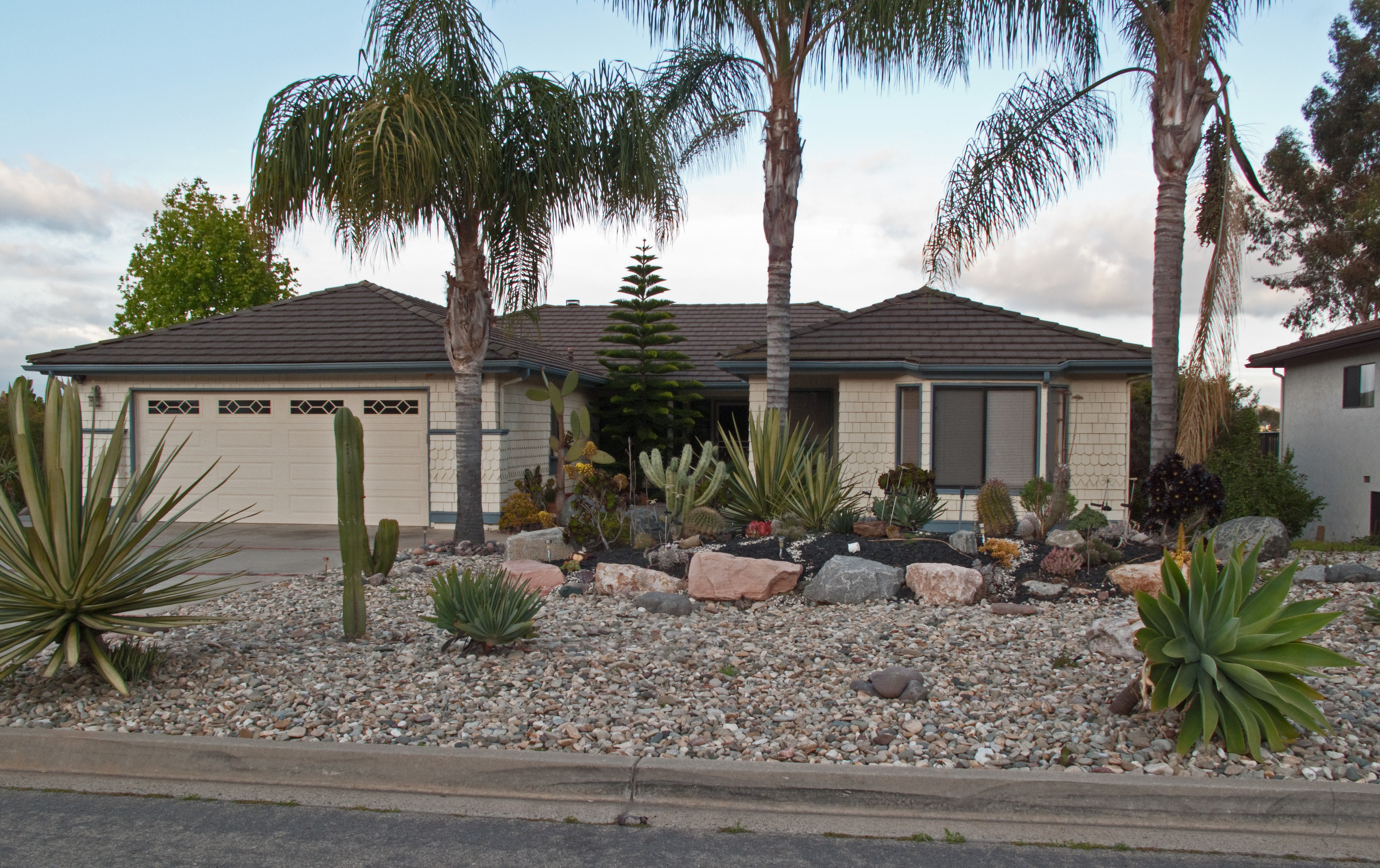
An example of a property using xeriscaping. This method reduces the need for water which is often in limited supply in arid regions.

One major feature distinguishing sustainable gardens, landscapes and sites from other similar enterprises is the quantification of site sustainability by establishing performance benchmarks. Because sustainability is such a broad concept the environmental impacts of sites can be categorized in numerous ways depending on the purpose for which the figures are required. The process can include minimizing negative environmental impacts and maximizing positive impacts. As currently applied the environment is usually given priority over social and economic factors which may be added in or regarded as an inevitable and integral part of the management process. A home gardener is likely to use simpler metrics than a professional landscaper.

Three methods for measuring site sustainability include BREEAM developed by the BRE organization in the UK, LEED, developed in America and the Oxford 360 degree sustainability Index used in Oxford Park and developed by the Oxford Sustainable Group in Scandinavia.

== See also ==
- Carbon cycle re-balancing
- Climate-friendly gardening
- Context theory
- Foodscaping
- Green roof
- Landscape planning
- Manure tea
- Public Open Space (POS)
- Roof garden
- Sustainable architecture
- Sustainable design
- Sustainable landscaping
- Sustainable landscape architecture
- Sustainable planting
- Sustainable urban drainage systems
- Urban agriculture
- Urban forestry
- Xeriscaping
