= Bridge graft =

Grafting technique to bypass bark damage

A bridge graft is a grafting technique used to re-establish the supply of nutrients to the rootstock of a woody perennial when the full thickness of the bark has been removed from part of the trunk.

Damage to the innermost layer of the bark, called the phloem, can interrupt the transport of photosynthesized sugars throughout the tree. This damage is often caused by rodents and lagomorphs, stripping and girdling the tree. The inability to transport sugars causes stored nutrients to deplete, resulting in the plant's death.

A bridge graft uses scions to 'bridge' the gap. Each scion is taper cut to match the cambium layers of the scion with those of the tree to which it is being grafted. It is also vital that the scions be placed so that the end which was closest to their own roots, before they were cut, is at the bottom of the graft, and the end which was closest to the growing tip, is at the top. Incorrect placement, such as cells in the scion being upside down, will result in its death. Once in place, the graft wounds must be completely sealed, in order to facilitate adhesion and prevent infection of the site.

Where one-quarter or less of the trunk circumference has been girdled, it may not be necessary to use this technique. It can also be difficult to apply on small diameter trunks.

== Steps ==
According to contemporary arboricultural practices, the use of wound dressings and pruning paints is believed to potentially reduce a tree's natural resistance to infections. As a result, it is advised that such treatments should not be applied prior to performing grafting procedures. Trees naturally initiate the formation of callus tissues in response to injury, effectively compartmentalizing the damaged area into isolated sections. This defense mechanism is further influenced by environmental factors, including early colonization of bacteria and fungi on the exposed tissues, which can prompt the activation of the tree's innate protective responses.

== Materials ==
- Grafting wax
- Grafting knife
- Raffia (used to secure the graft prior to waxing)
- Scions
