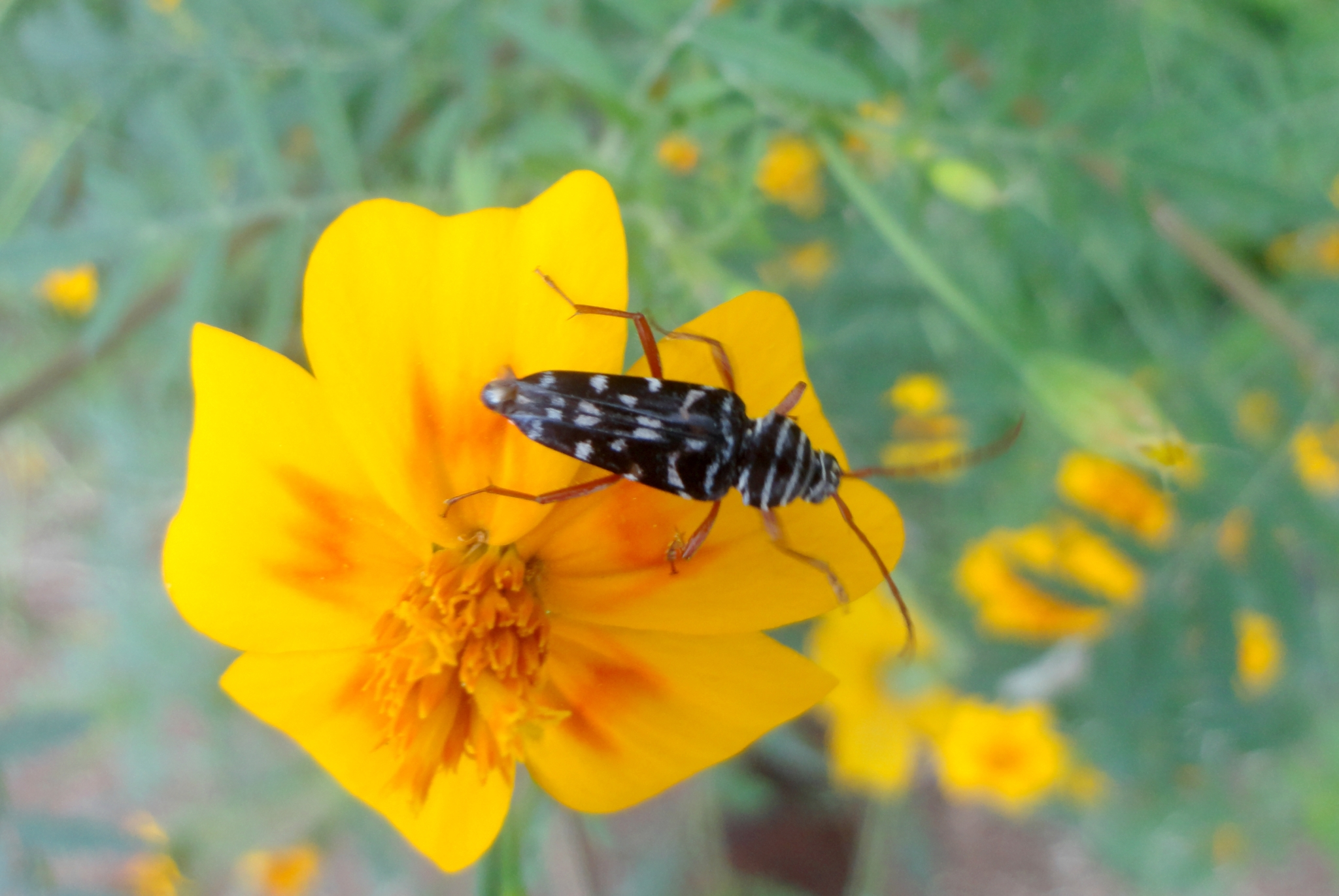

Scientific classification
- Kingdom: Animalia
- Phylum: Arthropoda
- Clade: Pancrustacea
- Class: Insecta
- Order: Coleoptera
- Suborder: Polyphaga
- Infraorder: Cucujiformia
- Family: Cerambycidae
- Genus: Placosternus
- Species: P. difficilis

Binomial name
- Placosternus difficilis (Chevrolat, 1862)

= Placosternus difficilis =

Species of beetle

Placosternus difficilis, commonly known as the mesquite borer, is a wood-boring longhorn beetle which resembles a black and yellow wasp. Larvae of mesquite borers are deposited in, among others, mesquite trees, although it has been recorded from a range of hosts and is considered polyphagous. It has been seen to be attracted to mesquite trees when there is freshly cut or broken limbs and logs. Adults use nectar and pollen as a food source.

It is known from the United States (California to Texas), Mexico, Honduras, Cuba, and the Bahamas.
