= Placosternus guttatus =

Scientific classification
- Kingdom: Animalia
- Phylum: Arthropoda
- Class: Insecta
- Order: Coleoptera
- Suborder: Polyphaga
- Infraorder: Cucujiformia
- Family: Cerambycidae
- Genus: Placosternus
- Species: P. guttatus

Binomial name
- Placosternus guttatus (Chevrolat, 1860)

Species of beetle

Placosternus guttatus is a species of beetle in the family Cerambycidae. It was described by Chevrolat in 1860.
