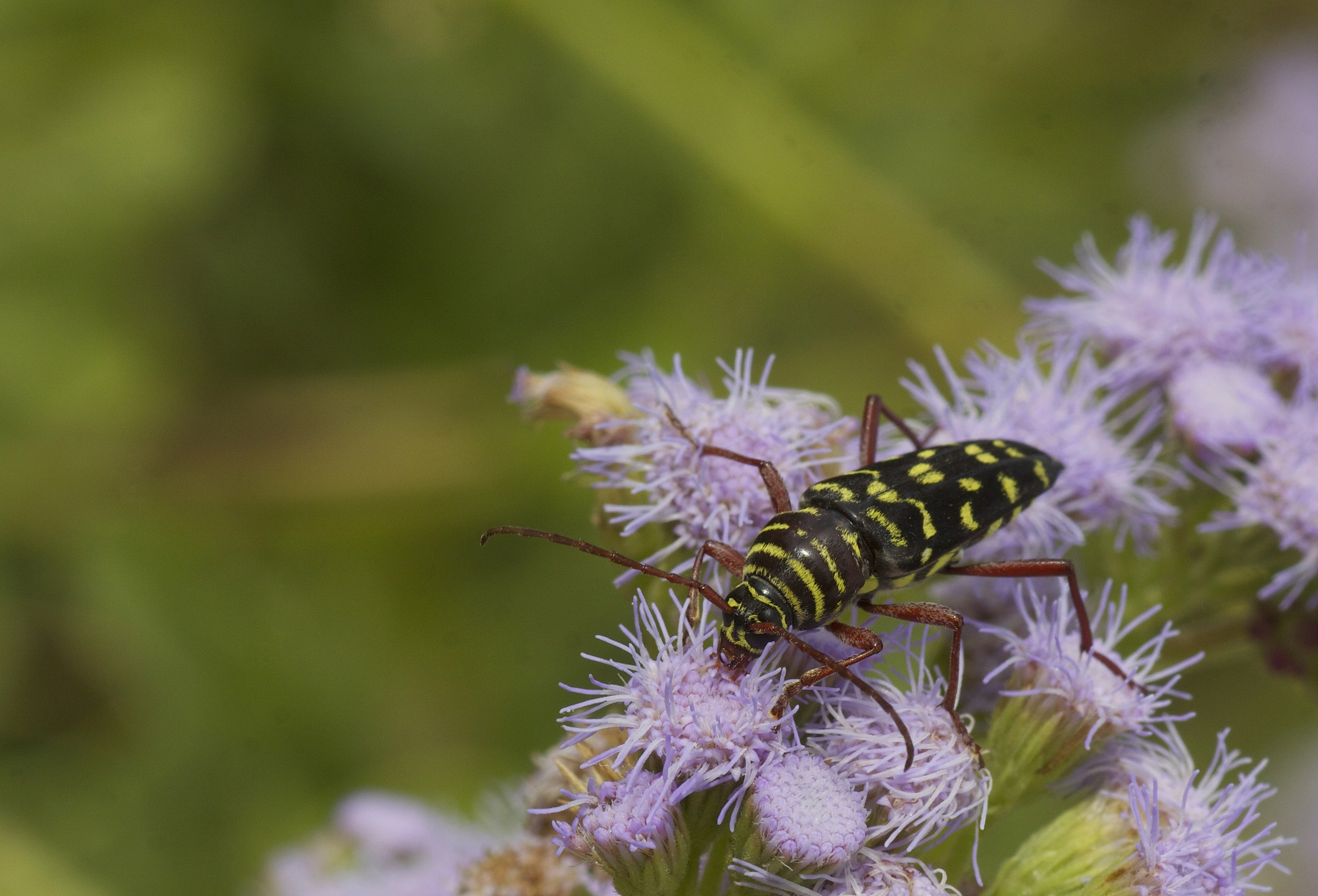
- Placosternus erythropus

Scientific classification
- Kingdom: Animalia
- Phylum: Arthropoda
- Class: Insecta
- Order: Coleoptera
- Suborder: Polyphaga
- Infraorder: Cucujiformia
- Family: Cerambycidae
- Subfamily: Cerambycinae
- Tribe: Clytini
- Genus: Placosternus; Hopping, 1937

= Placosternus =

Genus of beetles

Placosternus is a genus of beetles in the family Cerambycidae, containing the following species:

- Placosternus crinicornis (Chevrolat, 1860)
- Placosternus difficilis (Chevrolat, 1862)
- Placosternus erythropus (Chevrolat, 1835)
- Placosternus guttatus (Chevrolat, 1860)
