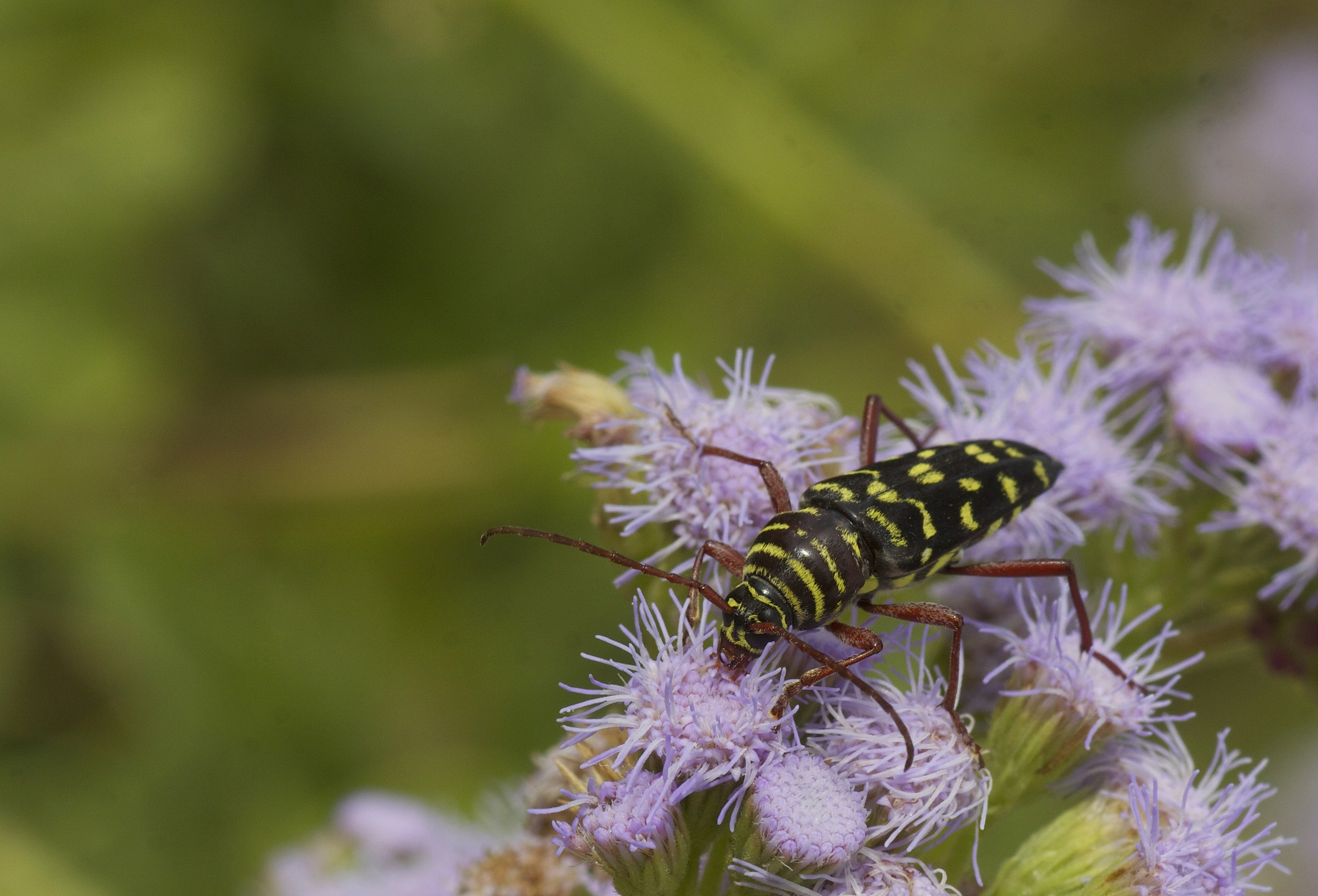

Scientific classification
- Kingdom: Animalia
- Phylum: Arthropoda
- Class: Insecta
- Order: Coleoptera
- Suborder: Polyphaga
- Infraorder: Cucujiformia
- Family: Cerambycidae
- Genus: Placosternus
- Species: P. erythropus

Binomial name
- Placosternus erythropus (Chevrolat, 1835)

= Placosternus erythropus =

Species of beetle

Placosternus erythropus is a species of beetle in the family Cerambycidae.

== Description ==
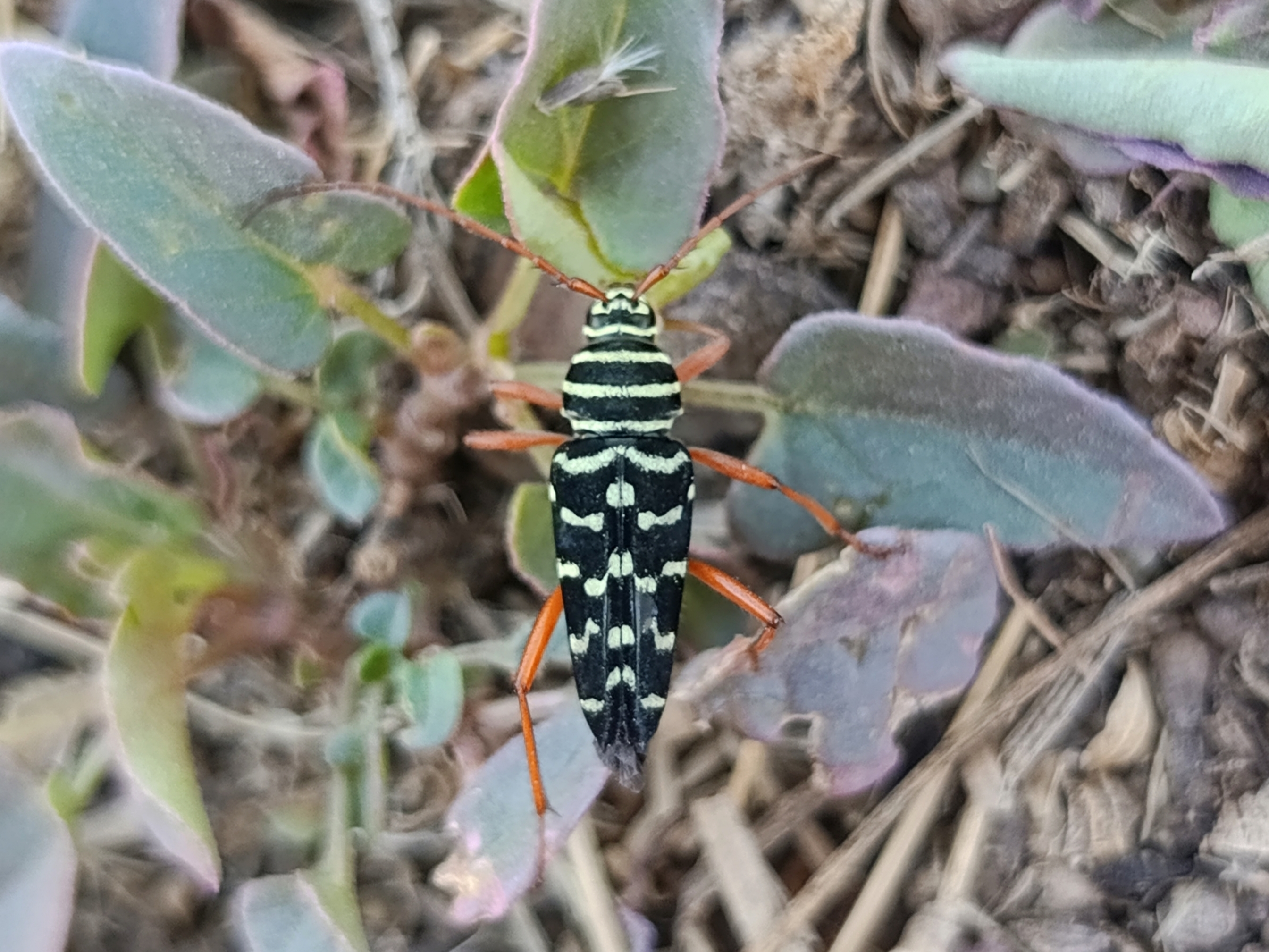
P. erythropus

Placosternus erythropus is a moderately slender beetle with exceptionally long antennae. In the US it's called "longhorned beetle," though that name is shared by many species in the family. Its body reaches up to 20mm long (25/32 inch).

The iNaturalist page showing images of the four species comprising the genus Placosternus shows that the species are quite similar to one another; all are black with white or yellowish stripes and spots, and bear red or reddish appendages.

Making identification even harder, the closely related genus Megacyllene embraces species which in shape, pattern and color are similar, as seen on the iNaturalist page comparing 35 Megacyllene species. The main physical distinction between the two genera is that there's a spine on the "basal antennomere" of Megacyllene species, while that spine is lacking on Placosternus species. An antennomere is any segment in an antenna, so a basal antennomore is the antennomere at the antenna's base.

== Range ==
Placosternus erythropus occurs in western and southern Texas in the US, south through Mexico and Central America into Costa Rica.

== Life cycle ==
Females deposit eggs in a woody plant's inner bark, the phloem. When the eggs hatch, each larva chews out its own chamber, first feeding on the phloem connecting with the cambium, later burrowing into the wood, the xylem. When larvae are ready to pupate, they widen their tunnel and line it with wood shavings or fibers, where they pupate. The newly emerged adults make an oval tunnel leading to the outside world, and fly away.

== Ecology ==
In Mexico Placosternus erythropus is called the Escarabajo Barrenador del Mezquite, the "Mesquite Borer Beetle." However, adults and larvae utilize a wide variety of trees other than mesquite, including acacias, apple, cherry, plum, peach, pear, hawthorn, eucalyptus, ash, elm, and shrubby members of the Aster Family such as Montanoa tomentosa and Gymnosperma glutinosum. Also they've been noticed attacking sycamores and citrus trees.

Adults even have been documented feeding on sliced red bell peppers set out to dry in the sunlight.

== Taxonomy ==
Placosternus erythropus was described by Chevrolat in 1835.

=== Synonyms & combinations ===
- Clytus erythropus Chevrolat, 1835
- Arhopalus erythropus Chevrolat, 1835
- Clytus (Cyllene) erythropus variegatus Castelnau & Gory, 1841
- Clytus (Cyllene) mexicanus Castelnau & Gory, 1841
- Clytus erythropus variegatus Castelnau & Gory, 1841
- Clytus mexicanus Castelnau & Gory, 1841
- Clytus variegatus Castelnau & Gory, 1841
- Clytus (Cyllene) erythropus Chevrolat, 1835
- Cyllene erythropa Chevrolat, 1835
- Cyllene erythropus Chevrolat, 1835
- Cyllene erythropus variegata Castelnau & Gory, 1841
- Cyllene mexicana Castelnau & Gory, 1841
- Megacyllene erythropa Chevrolat, 1835

== Etymology ==
In the genus name Placosternus, the placo- is Greek for "flat". The suffix -sternus is a form of the Greek word sternon, meaning "chest." Thus "flat-chested."

The species name erythropus is a word used in Latin but derived from the Greek term erythros, meaning "red", and pous, for "foot": "red-footed."
