= Grafting wax =

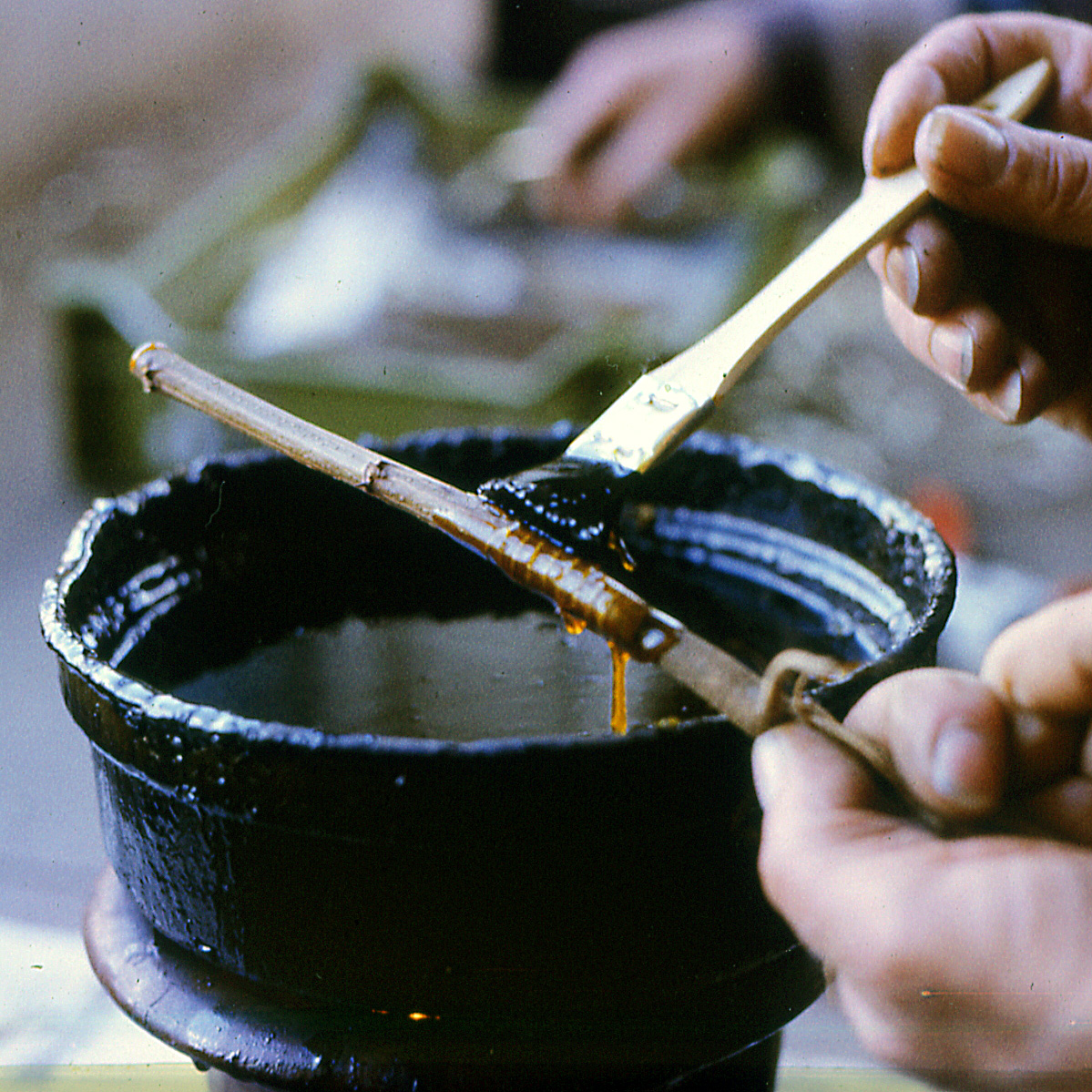
Grafting wax

Grafting wax is a composition of rosin, beeswax, tallow, and similar materials, used in gluing and sealing the wounds of newly grafted trees or shrubs to protect them from infection. The current formulation typically used in the northwestern portion of the United States for fruit trees, is based on a mixture created by Albert Sak, a German-from-Russia immigrant. The exact original composition is a closely guarded family secret.
