= Urban agriculture by region =

Urban agriculture is the practice of cultivating, processing and distributing food in or around urban areas. It is the growing of fresh produce within the city for individual, communal or commercial purposes in cities in both developed and developing countries.

== Argentina ==
The city of Rosario (population 1.3 million) has incorporated agriculture into its land-use planning and urban development strategy. Its Land Use Plan 2007–2017 makes specific provision for the agricultural use of public land. Under its Metropolitan Strategic Plan 2008–2018, Rosario is building a "green circuit", passing through and around the city, consisting of family and community gardens, large-scale, commercial vegetable gardens and orchards, multifunctional garden parks and "productive barrios" where agriculture is integrated into programs for constructing public housing and upgrading slums. In 2014 the green circuit consisted of more than 30 ha of land used to grow vegetables and fruit, as well as medicinal and aromatic plants. The city has five large, landscaped green areas known as "garden parks" covering a total of 72 ha of land, which are used both for agriculture and for cultural, sport and educational activities.

== Australia ==
Various studies propose that the increased usage of urban agricultural practices in Australian cities could profoundly mitigate the consequences of climate change and promote food security. In one 2020 study, the authors demonstrated that using 25% of vacant land and yard space in Sydney for urban agriculture practices could boost food supply by up to 15%.

In light of these potential benefits, urban agriculture is beginning to become more common in Australia, particularly in the form of urban farms and roadside gardens. In some cities, local councils have encouraged urban agriculture by providing residents with guidelines to support roadside gardens. In others, however, planning policies and regulations have impeded access to sufficient and suitable land for urban agriculture. In general, insufficient land is a major obstacle to agriculture in Australian cities.

In Queensland, the trend of utilizing aquaponics and self-watering containers has gained some popularity.

== Canada ==
=== British Columbia ===
A Canadian urban farmer in British Columbia has published details on a crop value rating (CVR) system that urban farmers can use to determine which crops to grow, based on each crop's contribution to supporting the farm economically. This entails forgoing some crops in favor of others, but he points out that urban farmers can develop business networks with rural farmers to bring some of those other crops to sale in the city. For example, an urban farmer may not be able to economically justify growing sweet corn (based on long days to maturity and low yield density per linear foot of row), but a networking arrangement is mutually beneficial, as it lets a rural sweet corn farmer gain an additional point of sale at retail price, while letting the urban farmer fill gaps in their product line.

Several community projects in Victoria, British Columbia were instigated to promote urban agricultural practices. For example, the Sharing Backyards program intends to get people living in urban areas in contact with others who have extra space in their yards for agricultural purposes. Some organizations run public demonstrations in gardens to educate people in urban parts of Vancouver about growing food in an urban setting.

Covering the roof of the west building of the Vancouver Convention Centre is the largest green roof in Canada and one of the 10 largest green roofs in the world. With around six acres of living space, it is home to more than 400,000 indigenous plants and grasses that provide insulation. It is also home to four Western honey bee beehives which pollinate the plants on the roof and provide honey. The living includes other sustainable practices such as recycling and reusing water.

The city of Kamloops, British Columbia, actively promotes urban agricultural practices within their community. They stress the importance of food security and its effect on the economy as well as the ecology. In 2014, they initiated the Food and Urban Agriculture Plan (FUAP), which lays out goals and strategies to implement a sustainable food system utilizing urban agriculture. The areas which they cover include: Food Production and Land Availability, Food Processing and Preparing, Food Distribution/Retail/Access, Cooking/Eating and Celebrating Food, Food Waste and Resource Management, as well as Education/Governance and Capacity Building.

=== Ontario ===
The City of Ottawa, Ontario is home to the largest urban farm in the nation, the Central Experimental Farm (CEF). Located near the center of the city, the 4 square kilometres (1.5 mi^{2}) farm is an agricultural facility, working farm, and research center for Agriculture and Agri-Food Canada. The City of Ottawa is also home to numerous urban farms within the 203.5-square-kilometre (78.6 sq mi) greenbelt.

Along with many other cities in Ontario, the City of Toronto allows eligible residents in 4 wards across the city to keep a maximum of 4 hens (no roosters) for the purpose of enjoyment or personal consumption of only the eggs. There are other requirements involved in rearing these hens under this program, such as zoning, and guidelines for building the enclosure, handling waste, and disposal. The wards eligible for this program from the UrbanHensTo site include Ward 13 (Parkdale-High Park), Ward 21 (St. Paul's), Ward 5 (Etobicoke-Lakeshore), and Ward 32 (Beaches-East York). Workshops are also available to those interested in rearing urban hens. However, failure to abide by these rules and regulations can result in fines.

=== Quebec ===
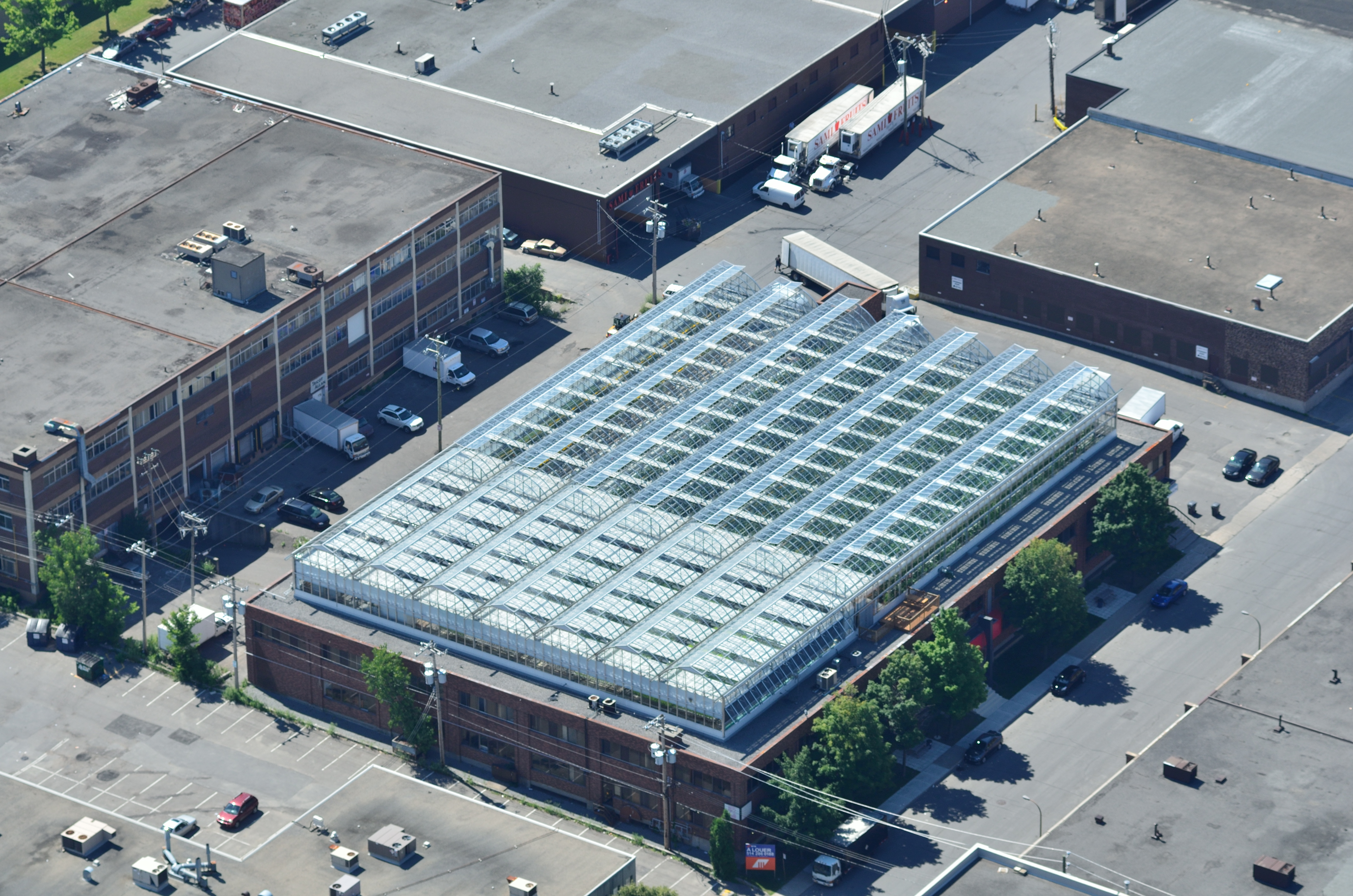
Lufa Farms greenhouses are constructed on the rooftops of Greater Montreal.

In Montreal, Quebec, about 100 community gardens provide plots where citizens can grow fruits, vegetables, herbs, and flowers. The largest community garden has about 255 allotment plots, while the smallest site has about 25 plots. Out of 2 million people living in the urbanized parts of Montreal, about 10,000 residents share the garden plots. The program has been in place since 1975 and is managed by the boroughs. Some of the boroughs have a gardening instructor who visits the gardens regularly to give gardeners tips. Soil, a water supply, a space for tools, sand, fencing, and paint are provided by the city, managed by the Department of Sports, Recreation and Social Development.

Canada has a number of companies working on urban farm technology, including in Montreal. The most significant is Lufa Farms, a private company that opened what is reported to be the world's largest rooftop greenhouse at 163,000 sq ft in the Montreal borough of Saint-Laurent. This is Lufa's fourth rooftop greenhouse in Montreal and is built on the roof of the former Sears Canada warehouse. Lufa's first rooftop greenhouse was built in early 2011, a 2880 sq metre (31,000 sq ft) hydroponic rooftop greenhouse atop a warehouse designated as their headquarters. They built two more large rooftop greenhouses in greater Montreal in 2013 (4,000 sq metre / 43,000 sq ft) and 2017 (5,850 sq metre / 63,000 sq ft), spending almost $10 million for the three structures. Also in 2017, an IGA supermarket in Saint-Laurent in Montreal unveiled a green roof of about 25,000 square feet of green space and products certified by Ecocert Canada. They state that they can provide over 50 different kinds of rooftop grown organic produce, along with honey produced and harvested from eight bee hives located on the roof.

Both Lufa and IGA rely on non-rooftop production for some of their produce. Only shallow-rooted plants can be cultivated on roofs, eliminating some staples such as potatoes and corn. Some local farmers point out that industrial urban agriculture systems are oversubsidized and present unfair competition.

== China ==
China has more than 1.4 billion people and more than 70% of them are expected to live in urban areas by 2035. Despite the economic and other benefits brought by fast urbanization and industrialization, Chinese urbanization has led to various problems such as diminishing cultivable land, lack of food security, and environmental destruction due to construction.

=== Beijing ===
Beijing's increase in land area from 4,822 square kilometres (1,862 sq mi) in 1956 to 16,808 square kilometres (6,490 sq mi) in 1958 led to the increased adoption of peri-urban agriculture. Such "suburban agriculture" produced more than 70% of non-staple food in Beijing, mainly consisting of vegetables and milk, within the city itself during the 1960s and 1970s. Recently, with relative food security in China, periurban agriculture has become focussed on quality produce rather than quantity. One more recent experiment in urban agriculture in Beijing has been the Modern Agricultural Science Demonstration Park in Xiaotangshan.

=== Shenzhen ===
Traditionally, Chinese cities have mixed agricultural activities into the urban setting. Shenzhen, once a small farming community, is now a fast-growing metropolis due to the Chinese government's designation as an open economic zone. Due to the large and growing population in China, the government supports urban self-sufficiency in food production. Shenzhen's village structure, sustainable methods, and agricultural advancements initiated by the government have been strategically configured to supply food for the city. The city farms are located about 10 kilometres (6.2 mi) from the city center in a two-tier system. The first tier, closest to the city center, produces perishable items. Located just outside these farms, hardier vegetables are grown such as potatoes, carrots, and onions. This system allows producers to be sold in city markets a few hours after picking.

As the population grows and industry advances, the city tries to incorporate potential agricultural growth by experimenting with new agricultural methods. The Fong Lau Chee Experimental Farm in Dongguan, Guangdong has worked with new agricultural advancements in lychee production. This farm was established with aspirations of producing large quantities and high-quality lychees, by constantly monitoring sugar content and their seeds. This research, conducted by local agricultural universities allows for new methods to be used with hopes of reaching the needs of city consumers.

However, due to increased levels of economic growth and pollution, some urban farms have become threatened. The government has been trying to step in and create new technological advancements within the agricultural field to sustain levels of urban agriculture.

The city plans to invest 8.82 billion yuan in 39 agricultural projects, including a safe agricultural base, an agricultural high-tech park, agricultural processing and distribution, forestry, eco-agricultural tourism, which will form urban agriculture with typical Shenzhen characteristics

In conjunction with this program, the city is expected to expand the Buji Farm Produce Wholesale Market.

According to the Municipal Bureau of Agriculture, Forestry and Fishery, the city will invest 600 million yuan on peri-urban farms, with hopes of the farms to provide "60 percent of the meat, vegetables, and aquatic products in the Shenzhen market".

There has also been an emerging trend of going green and organic as a response to pollution and pesticides used in farming practices. Vegetable suppliers are required to pass certain inspections held by the city's Agriculture Bureau before they can be sold as "green".

== Cuba ==
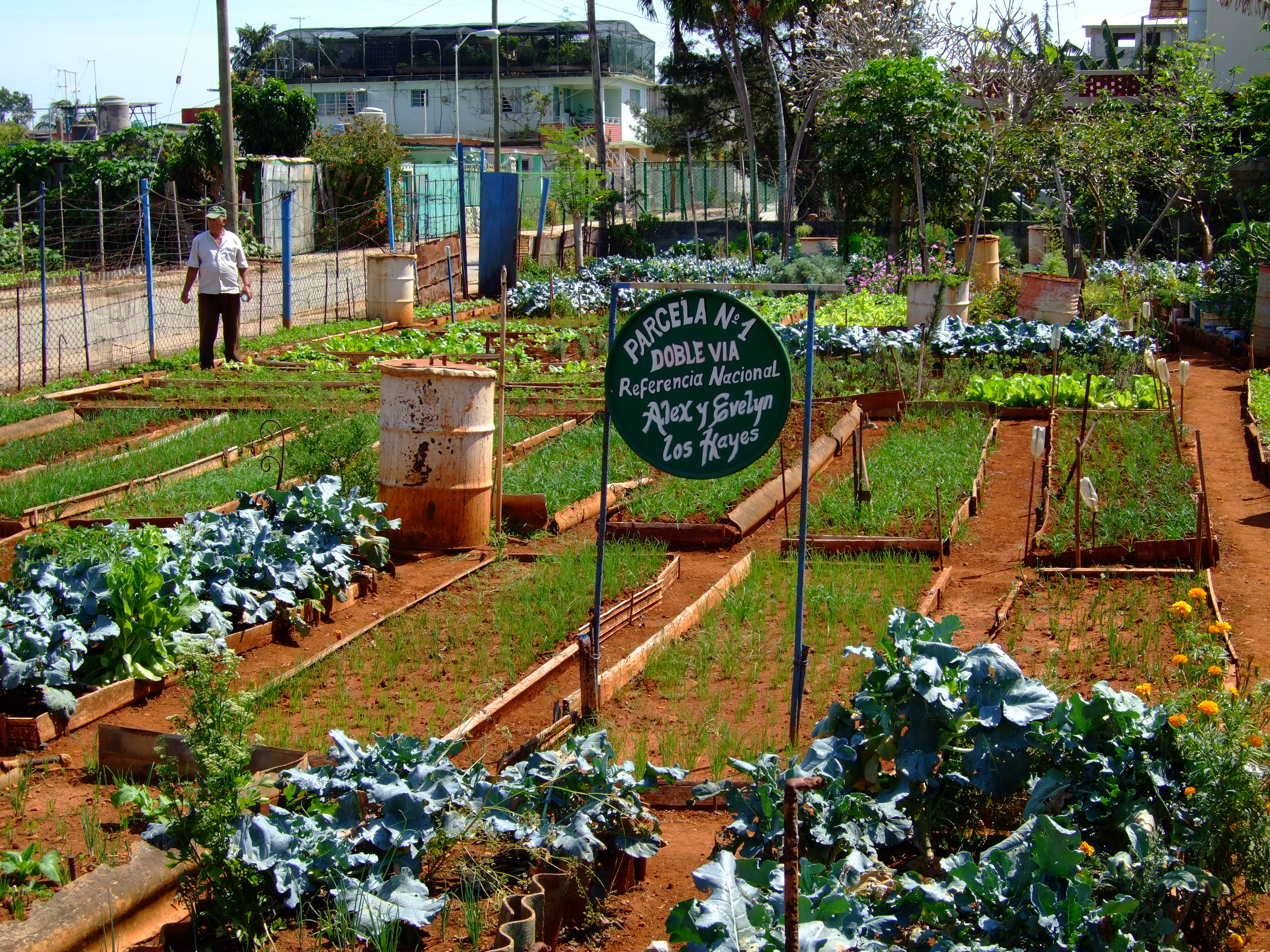
Farming enterprise in Havana, Cuba (2015)

After the disintegration of the Soviet Union and the Eastern Bloc, Cuba faced severe shortages of fuel and agrochemicals. These products had previously been imported from the Soviet Union in exchange for Cuban sugar. As a result, Cubans experienced an acute food crisis in the early 1990s, part of the response to which was a popular movement of urban agriculture. Since then, urban farmers have employed agroecological techniques, partly alleviating the need for petroleum-based inputs.

In 2002, 35,000 acres (14,000 ha) of urban gardens produced 3,400,000 short tons (3,100,000 t) of food. 90% of Havana's fresh produce came from local urban farms and gardens. In 2003, more than 200,000 Cubans worked in the expanding urban agriculture sector.

== Egypt ==
In Egypt, development of rooftop gardens began in the 1990s. In the early 1990s at Ain Shams University, a group of agriculture professors developed an initiative focused on growing organic vegetables to suit densely populated cities of Egypt. The initiative was applied on a small scale; until it was officially adopted in 2001, by the Food and Agriculture Organization (FAO).

== France ==
In 2014, Paris Mayor Anne Hidalgo promised to devote 100 hectares (250 acres) of Paris to green space, with 30 hectares specializing in urban agriculture. Over 60 urban farming organizations emerged in Paris over the following five years.

In 2020, a rooftop farm of 14,000 m^{2}, the largest in the world, began yielding produce in the 15th arrondissement of Paris. rather than soil, the farm uses aeroponics to produce berries, lettuce, and herbs, and coir for various vegetables. Its produce reduces food mileage for urban consumers and sells at prices higher than intensive agriculture, but lower than most organic producers.

The French Association for Professional Urban Agriculture (AFAUP, French: Association Française d'Agriculture Urbaine Professionnelle) is a global organization which provides management of professional urban agriculture.

== Ghana ==
Urban agriculture has been present in West African cities for decades. The practice of vegetable cultivation in Ghana began under European colonization. During the period between World War I and II, the colonial government usurped urban vegetable farms in order to feed the allied forces stationed in the country. Prior to 1972, government officials were largely hostile to the planting of indigenous crops. However, economic downturn and food shortages during the mid-1970s led to a major policy reversal, and Ghanaians across the country were encouraged to grow food of their own choosing.

Now, there are seven types of urban agriculture systems in Accra, and these practices been able to contribute not only to food security, but also sanitation, water management, and public health. Irrigated urban vegetable production is the most common agricultural activity within the city, which uses wastewater to irrigate crops. According to one study, this irrigation system necessitates "manual fetching or pumps", which allows plots to benefit from the nutrients remaining in the water, and supports Accra's sanitation system. In Accra, men are primarily responsible for the labors of urban farming.

== India ==
Economic development in Mumbai brought a growth in population caused mainly by the migration of laborers from other regions of the country. The number of residents in the city increased more than twelve times in the last century. Greater Mumbai, formed by City Island and Salsette Island, is the largest city in India with a population of 16.4 million, according to data collected by the census of 2001. Mumbai is one of the densest cities in the world, 48,215 persons per km^{2} and 16,082 per km^{2} in suburban areas. In this scenario, urban agriculture seems unlikely to be put into practice since it must compete with real estate developers for the access and use of vacant lots. Alternative farming methods have emerged as a response to the scarcity of land, water, and economic resources employed in UPA.

Dr. Doshi's city garden methods are revolutionary for being appropriate to apply in reduced spaces as terraces and balconies, even on civil construction walls, and for not requiring big investments in capital or long hours of work. His farming practice is purely organic and is mainly directed to domestic consumption. His gardening tools are composed of materials available in the local environment: sugarcane waste, polyethylene bags, tires, containers and cylinders, and soil. The containers and bags (open at both ends) are filled with the sugarcane stalks, compost, and garden soil, which make possible the use of a minimal quantity of water is compared to open fields. Doshi states that solar energy can replace soil in cities. He also recommends the idea of chain planning, or growing plants in intervals and in small quantities rather than at once and in large amounts. He has grown different types of fruit such as mangos, figs, guavas, bananas and sugarcane stalks in his terrace of 1,200 sq ft (110 m^{2}) in Bandra. The concept of city farming developed by Doshi consumes the entire household's organic waste. He subsequently makes the household self-sufficient in the provision of food: 5 kilograms (11 lb) of fruits and vegetables are produced daily for 300 days a year.

The main objectives of a pilot project at city farm at Rosary High School, Dockyard Road, were to promote economic support for street children, beautify the city landscape, supply locally produced organic food to urban dwellers (mainly those residing in slums), and to manage organic waste in a sustainable city. The project was conducted in the Rosary School, in Mumbai, with the participation of street children during 2004. A city farm was created in a terrace area of 400 sq ft (37 m^{2}). The participants were trained in urban farming techniques. The farm produced vegetables, fruits, and flowers. The idea has spread the concept of a city farm to other schools in the city.

The Mumbai Port Trust (MBPT) central kitchen distributes food to approximately 3,000 employees daily, generating important amounts of organic disposal. A terrace garden created by the staff recycles 90% of this waste in the production of vegetables and fruits. Preeti Patil, who is the catering officer at the MBPT explains the purpose of the enterprise:

Mumbai Port Trust has developed an organic farm on the terrace of its central kitchen, which is an area of approximately 3,000 sq ft (280 m^{2}). The activity of city farming was started initially to dispose of kitchen organic waste in an eco-friendly way. Staff members, after their daily work in the kitchen, tend the garden, which has about 150 plants.

== New Zealand ==
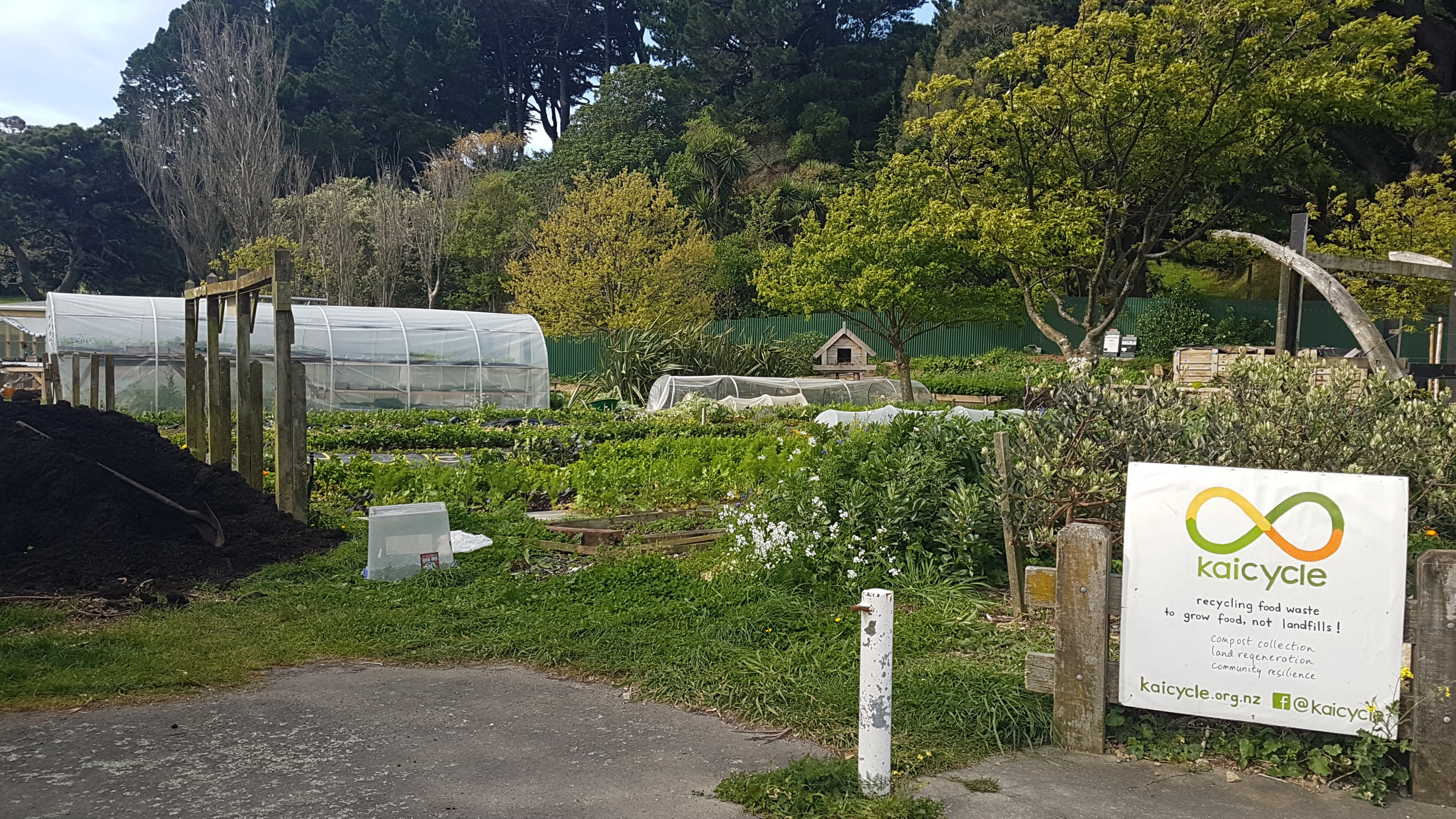
Kaicycle urban farm in Wellington, New Zealand

An urban farm called Kaicycle in the capital city Wellington was established in 2015. It started as a way of composting local food waste, food scraps are collected by bicycle. Their criteria includes organic waste of up to 60 litres per week from local households and business. Their purpose is "diverting food waste from landfill and recycling these nutrients back into local soils". They garden on their urban farm with the compost they make and invite volunteers to help regularly. They sell some of the produce which helps pay for the composting operations, they also share it with volunteers and donate to community food projects. In 2020 it joined a new network of composting hubs managed by the Sustainability Trust.

== Singapore ==
Since the city state currently only produces less than 10% of food requirements locally, the Singaporean government has actively backed starters of urban farms in the city state with grants. As part of Singapore's "30 by 30" plan to produce 30% of the island state's food locally by 2030, the Urban Redevelopment Authority has actively encouraged the growing of commercial crops on top of Singapore's iconic HDB buildings, as well as in skyscrapers. Singapore's urban farming segment had an estimated market value of 22 million Singapore dollars in 2019. The website of the Urban Redevelopment Authority gives some examples of Singapore's successes with urban farming:

Some local examples featured include Sky Greens' innovative 9-metre tall system that allows vegetables to grow outdoors and vertically; Sustenir Agriculture's indoor Controlled Environment Agriculture (CEA) farm that enables it to control all aspects of the environment to optimise crop growth; and Apollo Aquaculture Group's three-tier vertical recirculating aquaculture system that lets it grow pearl grouper, coral trout, and white shrimp indoors on multiple levels.

== Taiwan ==
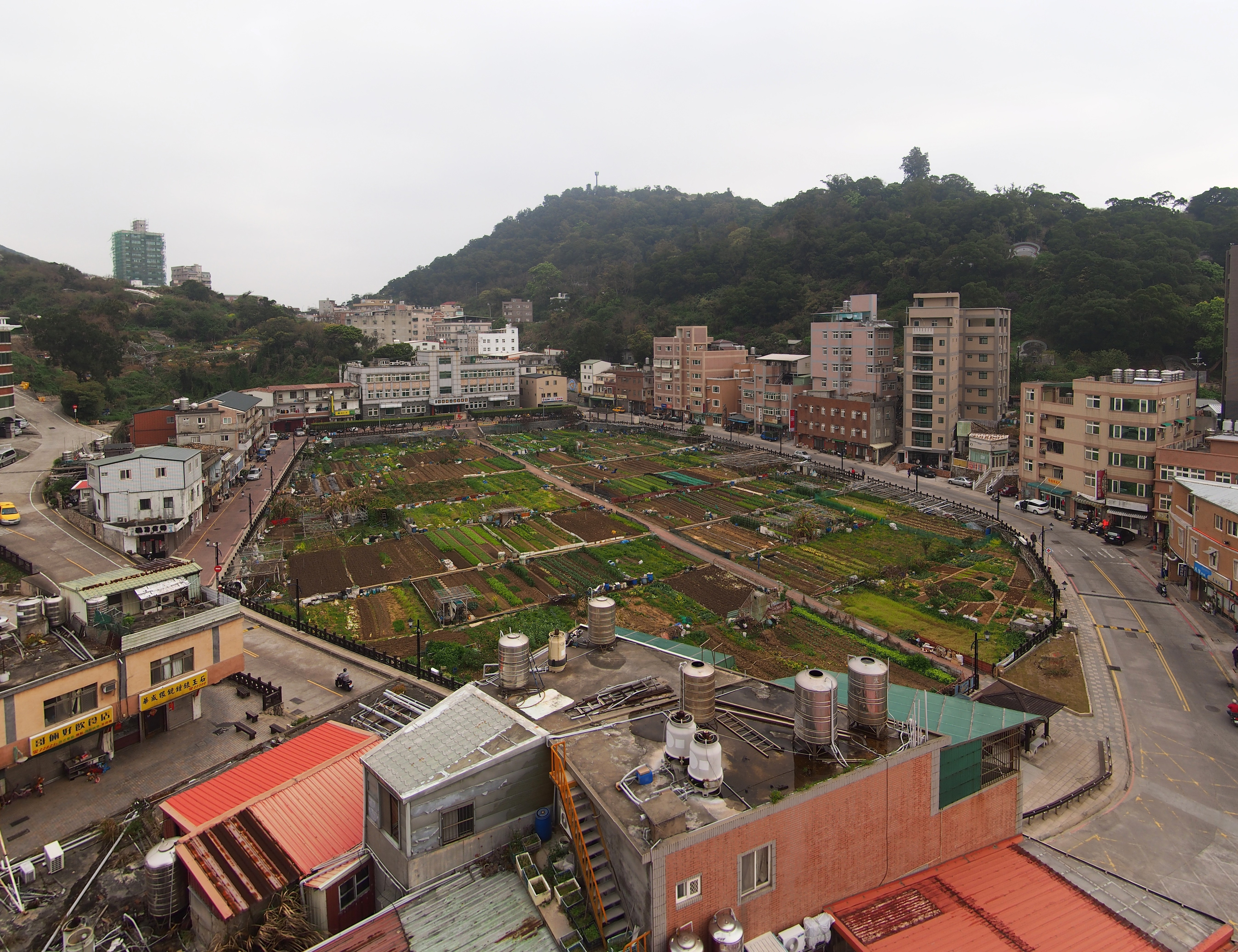
Shanlong Vegetable Park in Taiwan

In Matsu Islands, the local government established a vegetable farmland at the town center of Nangan.

== Thailand ==
In early 2000, urban gardens were started under the direction of the NGO, Thailand Environment Institute (TEI), to help achieve the Bangkok Metropolitan Administrations (BMA) priority to "green" Thailand. With a population of 12 million and 39% of the land in the city vacant due to rapid expansion of the 1960s–80s Bangkok is a testbed for urban gardens centered on community involvement. The two urban gardens initiated by TEI are in Bangkok Noi and Bangkapi and the main tasks were stated as:

- Teach members of the communities the benefits of urban green space.
- Create the social framework to plan, implement, and maintain the urban green space.
- Create a process of a method to balance the needs of the community with the needs of the larger environmental concerns.

While the goals of the NGO are important in a global context, the community goals are being met through the work of forming the urban gardens themselves. In this sense, the creation, implementation, and maintenance of urban gardens are highly determined by the desires of the communities involved. However, the criteria by which TEI measured their success illustrates the scope of benefits to a community which practices urban agriculture. TEI's success indicators were:

- Establishing an Urban Green Plan
- Community Capacity Building
- Poverty Reduction
- Links with Government
- Developing a Model for Other Communities

== United Kingdom ==
Todmorden is a town of 17,000 inhabitants in Yorkshire, United Kingdom with a successful urban agriculture model. The project, which began in 2008, has meant that food crops have been planted at forty locations throughout the town. The produce is all free, the work is done by volunteers, and passers-by and visitors are invited to pick and use the products. Some Todmorden plots have been permission plots while others have been examples of guerilla gardening. All are "propaganda gardens" promoting locals to consider growing local, to eat seasonal, to consider the provenance of their food, and to enjoy fresh. There are food plots in the street, in the health center car park, at the rail station, in the police station, in the cemetery, and in all the town's schools.

== United States ==
=== Nationwide Survey Findings ===
According to the USDA, a farm is defined as a location that produces and sells at least $1,000 worth of products. A study conducted on urban farms in 2012 surveyed over 315 farms identified as urban. Of those, over 32% were found in the Northeast, more than 26% in the South, 22% in the West, and less than 19% in the Midwest. The survey found that most urban farms in the United States are structured as either non-profit or solely owned. Urban farms typically use techniques that allow them to produce intensively on a small land. Mainly, these practices include raised beds, greenhouse, and container gardens. Of the products made, an overwhelming majority of urban farms focus on fresh vegetables, followed by herbs and flowers. If an urban farm focuses on animals, the primary animal is hens. Bees and sheep are the second most common urban farm animals.

Almost half of the urban farms that participated in the survey made a total gross sale adding to less than $10,000. The majority of these sales coming from farmer's markets, community-upported agriculture (CSA), and restaurants. Not even 5% of the urban farms could be considered according to total gross sales statistics. Most urban farms agree on the main challenges that they face; production costs, managing pests, managing weeds, and climate. They also see profitability, financing, and farm labor as big challenges of managing an urban farm.

=== New York ===
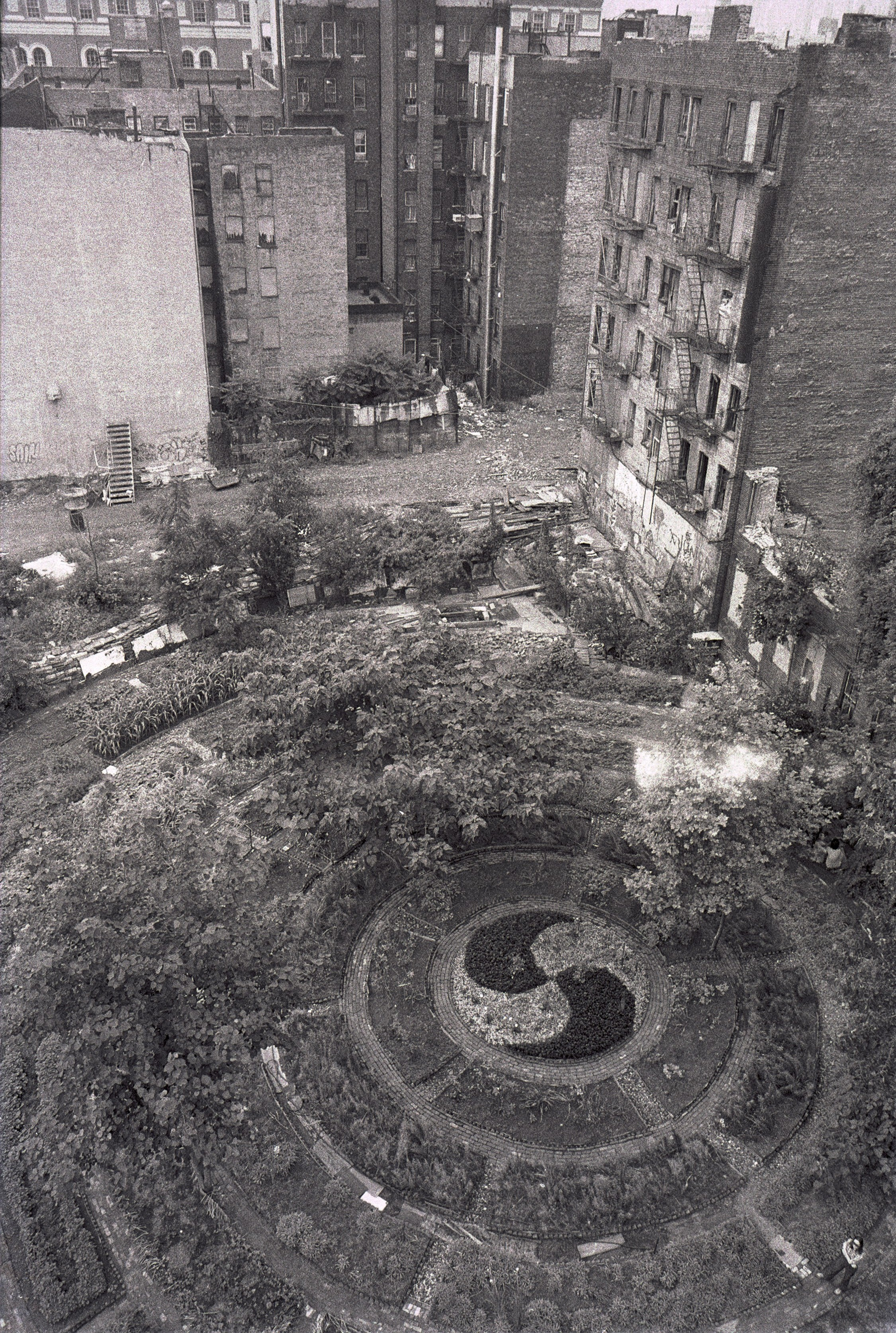
Garden of Adam Purple, lower east-side, New York City, 1984

New York City has become a laboratory for urban agriculture within the last decade. The city began to make significant strides in 2007 with the founding of the Mayor's Office of Food Policy, although urban agricultural initiatives are sponsored by other city agencies, too. The city's Department of Environmental Protection, for example, offers a grant program for private property owners in combined sewer areas of New York City. The minimum requirement for grantees is to manage 1" of stormwater runoff from the contributing impervious area. Eligible projects to manage water runoff include green roofs, rooftop farms, and rainwater harvesting on private property in combined sewer areas. The grant program has allowed New York City to build some of the world's largest rooftop farms.

Urban agriculture is especially important in New York City as many low-income residents suffer from high rates of obesity and diabetes and limited sources of fresh produce. The city and local nonprofit groups have been providing land, training and financial encouragement, but the impetus in urban farming has really come from the farmers, who often volunteer when their regular workday is done. One NYC urban agriculture initiative targeted at low-income residents is the Farms at NYCHA project. The program is a city-partnership placed in 12 neighborhoods that is intended to expand access to healthy food, promote healthy public housing committees and to develop young leadership. Another program comes from Grow to Learn, which provides opportunities for public school students to learn through urban farming. The program has grown to over 800 gardens since 2010.

There are various types of agricultural systems in New York City. Two alternate means of growing are: rooftop gardens and hydroponic (soil-less) growing. The New York Times wrote an article about one of Manhattan's first gardens which incorporate both these techniques. Additionally, some urban gardeners have used empty lots to start a community or urban gardens. However, the soil must be tested for heavy contamination in city soil because of vehicle exhaust and remnants of old construction. Regardless, there are hundreds of urban gardens across New York City. Controlled environment agricultural systems are also becoming increasingly common. According to one study, controlled environment agriculture systems in New York City have increased access to produce for some low-income communities and have created green-sector job opportunities. Proponents of hydroponic systems in particular have argued that producers like Gotham Greens have allowed city residents access to high nutrient produce within hours of its harvest.

Lastly, the city also has a composting program, which is available to gardeners, farmers, and residents. One group, GreenThumb, provides free seedlings. Another program, the City Farms project operated by the nonprofit Just Food, offers courses on growing and selling food.

=== California ===
In response to the recession of 2008, a coalition of community-based organizations, farmers, and academic institutions in California's Pomona Valley formed the Pomona Valley Urban Agriculture Initiative.

After the passage of the North American Free Trade Agreement, cheap grain from the United States flooded Mexico, driving peasant farmers off of their land. Many immigrated to the Pomona Valley and found work in the construction industry. With the 2008 recession, the construction industry also suffered in the region. It is unlikely to regain its former strength because of severe water shortages in this desert region as well as ongoing weakness in the local economy. These immigrants were dry land organic farmers in their home country by default since they did not have access to pesticides and petroleum-based fertilizers. Now, they found themselves on the border of two counties: Los Angeles County with a population of 10 million and almost no farmland, and San Bernardino County which has the worst access to healthy food in the state. In both counties, there is a growing demand for locally grown organic produce. In response to these conditions, Uncommon Good, a community-based nonprofit organization that works with immigrant farmer families, convened a forum which became the Urban Farmers Association. The Urban Farmers Association is the first organization of its kind for poor immigrant farmers in the Pomona Valley. Its goal is to develop opportunities for its members to support themselves and their families through urban agriculture. With Uncommon Good, it is a founding member of the Pomona Valley Urban Agriculture Initiative (PVUAI). The PVUAI is working with local colleges and universities to expand upon a food assessment survey that was done in the City of Pomona.

==== Oakland ====
Urban agriculture in West Oakland has taken a radical form that can be traced back to community gardening initiatives starting in the 1970s in the cities of Berkeley and Oakland, and the city's African-American heritage. Oakland's manufacturing industry attracted new residents during WWII. To reduce racial tension, the Oakland Housing Authority established housing projects for blacks in West Oakland and whites in East Oakland. With exclusionary covenants and redlining by banks, development capital was kept out of West Oakland while the African-American population had limited opportunities to rent or buy housing outside West Oakland.

The Black Panther Party (BPP) played a role in seeding urban agricultural practices in West Oakland. One of its social programs aimed to improve the access to healthy food for the city's black population by providing breakfast in local schools, churches, and community centers. A small amount of this food came from small local gardens planted by BPP members. According to Prof. Nathan McClintock, "The Panthers used gardening as a coping mechanism and a means of supplementing their diets, as well as a means to strengthen community members engaged in the struggle against oppression." The People of Color Greening Network (PCGN) was created in the 1990s. The group planted in empty and vacant lots in West Oakland. In addition, schools around Alameda County began teaching basic gardening skills and food education. Other groups have carried on those legacies, such as People's Grocery and Planting Justice.

In 1998, the city of Oakland's Mayor's Office of Sustainability proposed a Sustainable Community Development Initiative towards sustainable development. Due to West Oakland's lack of access to nutritious and healthy food, other organizations including the PCGN and City Slicker Farms demanded the plan include strategies for creating a sustainable impact on the local food system. City Slicker Farms was founded in 2001 in response to the lack of access to fresh produce in West Oakland. Through land donations from local residents, a network of urban farms was created through the Community Market Farms Program, and in 2005 the organization established the Backyard Garden Program to aid West Oakland residents in growing their own food at home. This program now grows upwards of 30,000 lbs. of food each year.

In 2005, Mayor Jerry Brown signed the UN World Environment Day Urban Environmental Accords, pledging Oakland to become a more sustainable city by the year 2012. This gave rise to Oakland City Council Resolutions, such as No. 76980 and No. 80332 which helped develop a Food Policy Council. It has teamed up with the Health of Oakland's People & Environment (HOPE) Collaborative, which works to improve the health and wellness of Oakland's residents. In 2009 the Oakland Food Policy Council started to plan urban agriculture in Oakland.

=== Detroit ===
Since 2010, urban farming has rapidly expanded in the city of Detroit. Once home to nearly 2 million people, the city of Detroit now has a population under 700,000. The population loss resulted in many vacant lots and properties. In an attempt to obtain healthier foods and beautify the neighborhood, residents began to repurpose the land and create urban farms. Small community gardens grew into larger projects with numerous non-profits forming to address both the problems of food deserts and vacant properties.

Across American cities, some urban gardens and green initiatives have taken the form environmental gentrification. The garden and farming projects have been found to increase rent prices and attract wealthier residents, resulting in physical and cultural displacement, as well as demographic changes. However, Detroit is unique as many of the urban agricultural initiatives are led by people of color, utilize empty land and are more accessible to neighboring residents.

Michigan's Urban Farming Initiative (MUFI) is a non-profit organization using urban agriculture as a way to promote education and social justice and empower urban communities. MUFI is based out of the North End of Detroit and has a roughly three acre campus. Since 2011, MUFI has transformed the space with help from over 10,000 volunteers and grown over 50,000 pounds of produce. Currently, the organization is working to connect the MUFI farm with the community through subsidized products for local residents and the construction of a three-story community center.

Keep Growing Detroit (KGD), founded in 2013, seeks to create a food sovereign, self-sustainable Detroit with healthy communities and resilient local economies. The organization consists of numerous programs such as the Garden Resource Program, which supports 1600 urban farms, and Grown in Detroit, which connects urban farmers with local markets and restaurants. The organization is also partnered with several youth groups and has a seven-week summer apprentice program focused on farming, business, finance and leadership skills. In 2019, KGD helped hundreds of new farmers secure land and educated them about the benefits of and keys to urban agriculture.

Hantz Woodlands, also known as Hantz Farms, is an urban tree farm located on the east side of Detroit. Hantz Woodlands is a project of the Hantz Group, headed by businessman and Detroit-native John Hantz. The project has cleared more than 2,000 vacant city-owned lots and has demolished blighted homes to make way for the hardwood tree farm. It is currently the largest urban tree farm in the US. So far, Hantz Woodlands has invested over 1 million dollars in the community and has planted 25,000 trees over 140 acres. The initiative has been credited with raising home values by 482% and beautifying the surrounding neighborhood. However, controversy and skepticism still surrounds the Hantz Farms project. Critics argue years after acquiring acres of land from Detroit, Hantz could sell the property for development into high-end and commercial real-estate. This action would generate massive profits for the Hantz Group while hurting community cohesion and leaving no payoff for long-time residents.

The Greening of Detroit is an urban forestry program and non-profit partner in The Detroit Partnership. As of November 2020, the organization has planted over 130,000 trees throughout Detroit. In addition to planting trees in the Detroit area, the Greening of Detroit engages in urban forestry education, job training, and other community programs. The organization is also involved in urban farming and currently oversees Lafayette Greens. The green space, located in downtown Detroit, grows chemical-free fruits, vegetables, herbs and flowers for the public to enjoy.

More recently, the city of Detroit has started investing in urban green initiatives. In 2019, Mike Duggan, the mayor of Detroit, outlined plans to increase demolition of blighted properties in the city. One proposed way to revitalize Detroit was through the creation of community gardens, green spaces, and urban orchards. Detroit's largest upcoming project is the Joe Louis Greenway (JLG), a 32-mile non-motorized loop which will stretch from the downtown Detroit Riverfront to Highland Park. The trail is estimated to cost $50 million raising concerns from residents who feel the money could be better spent addressing the blight and unemployment in the city. The leaders of the project argue the JLG will bring neighborhood stabilization and development resulting in affordable housing and jobs. Scholars identify two potential trajectories for the project: green gentrification, where "open space will move into private hands, rather than being dedicated to community or public use", or green reparations where "projects would be undertaken with a specific intent of achieving social equity". Detroit's public officials have the opportunity and power to steer JLG along either of the paths, only one of which benefits predominately minority communities and areas of historical disinvestment.

=== Illinois ===
Urban farming initiatives across the State of Illinois, including Chicago, have been spearheaded by advocacy groups. In addition, HB3418 allows municipalities and counties across the state, including Chicago, to establish urban agriculture zones (UAZs), supported by financial incentives such as reduced water rates, utility fees, and property tax abatements. Furthermore, the USDA has implemented the Outreach and Technical Assistance for Socially Disadvantaged and Veteran Farmers and Ranchers Program (the 2501 Program) which was transferred from USDA's National Institute of Food and Agriculture. The primary purpose of the 2501 Program is to enhance the coordination of outreach, technical assistance, and education efforts, to reach socially disadvantaged and veteran farmers, ranchers, and forest landowners and to improve their participation in the full range of USDA programs.

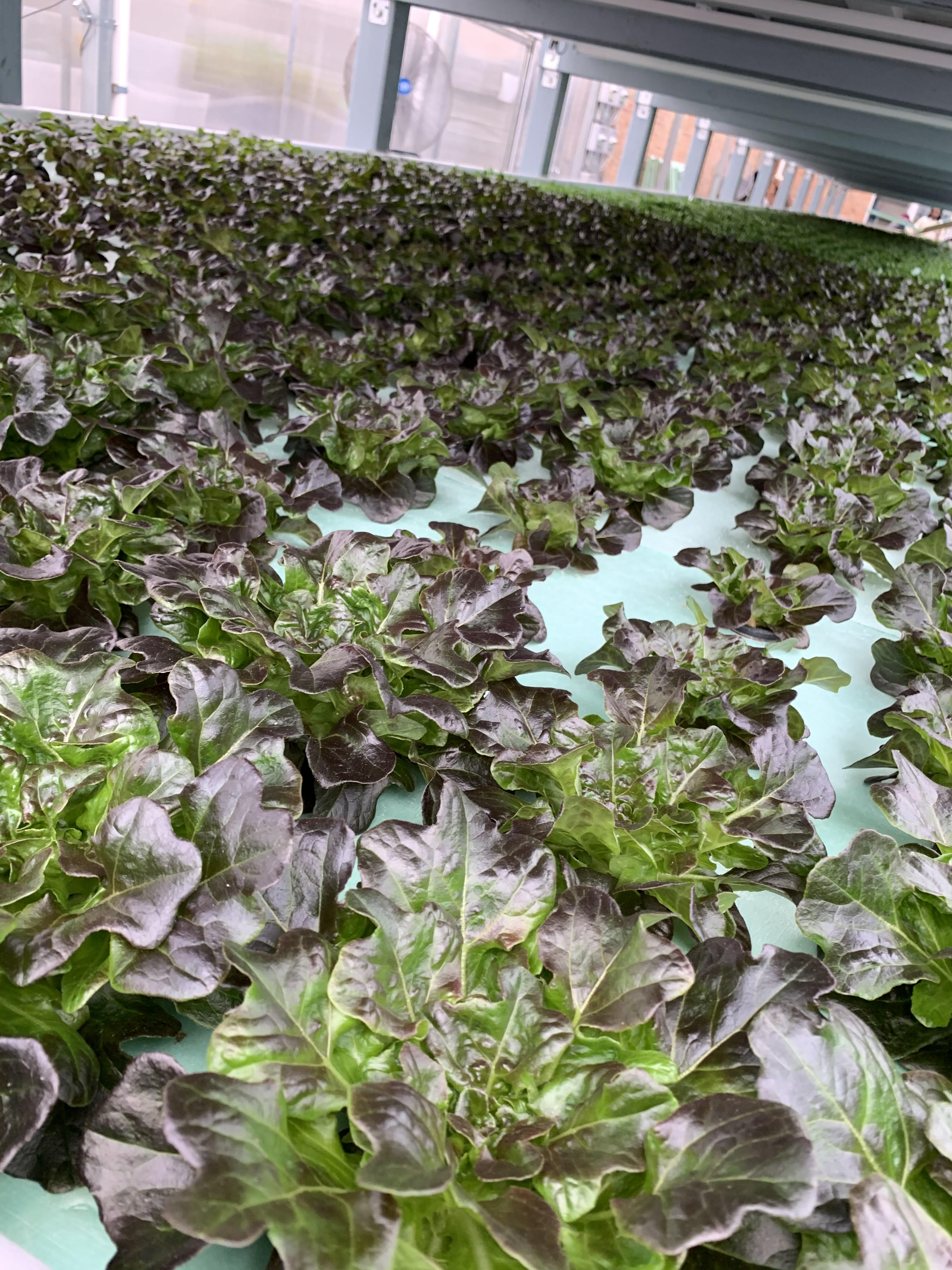
Farm on Odgen by Chicago Botanic Garden

== Zimbabwe ==
Harare is particularly suited for urban agriculture, as its topography heavily features vleis, land drainage systems that become waterlogged in the rainy season. When it rains they are difficult to cross, and in the dry season they shrink and crack, which causes structural damage to infrastructure, even though the vleis are still storing water underground. Therefore, these moisture-rich areas are mostly left unbuilt, allowing for urban cultivation.

Aside from vleis and the private residential land that Harareans cultivate, considerable public land is used for agriculture in Harare: along public roads, railway lines, undeveloped plots, road verges, and the banks of ditches. The land is mostly used for maize, groundnuts, sweet potatoes, green vegetables, fruits, paprika, and flowers. This unsanctioned cultivation has a history of necessity: in colonial times, laborers wanted towns where they could cultivate crops like at their rural homes, and with very low income, needed to supplement their food supply.

However, urban agriculture in Harare causes harm to the environment. The practice has reduced rainwater infiltration into the soil by 28.5% and lowered tree species diversity. In addition, most informal urban farmers use harmful chemical fertilizers. Urban agriculture has also been viewed negatively in Harare because it impedes on housing and urban development. In the eyes of Zimbabwean laws, agriculture was not an "urban" activity or a legitimate form of land use in cities. In 1983, the Greater Harare Illegal Cultivation Committee was formed, though its efforts to curb urban agriculture wholly failed.

In the 1990s, the failure of Structural Adjustment Programs induced greater unemployment, higher prices, and lower incomes, so more people started growing their own food. Between 1990 and 1994, Harare's cultivation area increased by 92.6%. The boom in urban agriculture improved both the food security and the nutrition of its practitioners, as well as additional income from selling excess produce. The practice continued in the 2000s when a major recession brought about widespread poverty, unemployment, and enormous inflation. Finally, the 2002 Nyanga Declaration on Urban Agriculture in Zimbabwe explicitly acknowledged the value of urban agriculture for food security and the reduction of poverty. Accepting that many people depend on it to survive, the government allocated sixty thousand hectares of land in Harare for cultivation purposes.
