= Building-integrated agriculture =

Building-integrated agriculture (BIA) is the practice of locating high-performance hydroponic greenhouse farming systems on and in mixed-use buildings to exploit synergies between the built environment and agriculture.

Typical characteristics of BIA installations include recirculating hydroponics, waste heat captured from a building's heating-ventilation-air condition system (HVAC), solar photovoltaics or other forms of renewable energy, rainwater catchment systems, and evaporative cooling.

The earliest example of BIA may have been the Hanging Gardens of Babylon around 600 BC. Modern examples include Eli Zabar's Vinegar Factory Greenhouse, Gotham Greens, Dongtan, Masdar City, and Lufa Farms.

The term building-integrated agriculture was coined by Ted Caplow in a paper delivered at the 2007 Passive and Low Energy Cooling Conference in Crete, Greece.

== Background ==
Applications of BIA are motivated by trends in patterns of energy use, global population, and global climate change. Specific observations include:

- According to official UN estimates, the global population is expected to exceed nine billion by 2050. Food travels hundreds of thousands of miles to reach urban consumers, adding to traffic congestion, air pollution, and carbon emissions.
- Global warming is predicted to lead to widespread shortages of food, water, and arable land by 2050.
- Globally, modern agriculture uses 70% of freshwater withdrawals, is the world's largest source of water pollution, and is the largest consumer of land.
- In the United States, buildings account for 39% of energy use, 68% of electricity consumption, 12% of water consumption, and 38% of carbon dioxide emissions.
- Increased urbanization, results in the marginalization of the natural world and distance from food production.

== Environmental advantages ==
Proponents maintain that BIA is an environmentally sustainable strategy for urban food production that reduces our environmental footprint, cuts transportation costs, enhances food security/safety, conserves water, protects rivers, improves health, reduces waste, cools buildings, and combats global warming. For example, hydroponics uses ten to twenty times less land and ten times less water than conventional agriculture, while eliminating chemical pesticides, fertilizer runoff, and carbon emissions from farm machinery and long-distance transport. Using a building's waste heat and solar photovoltaic panels reduce fossil fuel emissions that typically result from production and distribution. Rainwater catchment systems help to manage stormwater, much like a green roof.

== Economics ==
Integrating a farm into a building offers all of the building performance benefits of a more conventional green roof, and results in a lower combined energy bill than if the components were separate. These systems are achievable with extant technology. Projects such as Gotham Greens 10,000-square-foot (930 m^{2}) greenhouse will cost approximately $1.4 million to build. Shulman, Robin. "Raising the Root: Some City Dwellers Are Hoping Rooftop Farming Will Bear Fruit.". The economics of BIA were the subject of a 2011 article in the business section of The New York Times.

== Applications ==
Mohamed Hage, founder of Lufa Farms, talks to Silver Donald Cameron.

BIA systems may be integrated into industrial, commercial, educational, and residential buildings of varying sizes. Feasibility varies based on building size, climate, availability of light, and new build vs. retrofit. BIA farms can be installed on the building's envelope to make maximum use of normal light. Both horizontal (rooftop) and vertical (façade) surfaces may be used. BIA can also extend into the indoor space of a building, such as basement cultivation/indoor plant factories.

A sprinkling of rooftop hydroponic greenhouses can be found around the world, including at academic centers in the United States (Washington University and Barnard College, among others); on a hospital (Changi) in Singapore; in the Netherlands, in India, and in parts of the developing world. The Science Barge, while not on a building, is widely credited with an invigorating interest in BIA in New York City, following its 2007 public debut.

=== Retrofit ===
Example retrofit projects include: Eli Zabar's Vinegar Factory Greenhouse, which has been growing vegetables since 1995 heats his rooftop greenhouse with waste heat from the store's bakery, and Gotham Greens, a company building New York City's first commercial-scale, hydroponic rooftop farm.

=== New build ===
Example new build projects include the Forest Houses greenhouse, a fully integrated rooftop farm integrated onto the rooftop of an affordable housing complex, and Solar Two, an environmental learning center that will feature a Vertically Integrated Greenhouse.

=== Proposed ===
Proposed projects include Masdar City, a carbon-neutral city being built in Abu Dhabi, UAE, and India.

== Related concepts ==
Vertical farming is a proposed agricultural concept in which entire urban high-rise buildings, not just the building envelope, are dedicated to large-scale farming. According to various researchers, to be realized vertical farms would require significant technological breakthroughs with regards to energy consumption and lighting. It has been estimated that a prototype five-story farm would cost between $20 million to $30 million.

In compost-heated greenhouses, heat and carbon dioxide are generated from a manure-based compost contained in a special chamber attached to one side of the greenhouse. The New Alchemy Institute designed and built an experimental composting greenhouse in 1983 to research opportunities for the production of biothermal energy. Growing Power utilizes heat produced through vermicomposting to provide heat for their greenhouse.

== See also ==
- Aquaculture
- Aquaponics
- Biophilic design
- Building-integrated photovoltaics
- Controlled Environment Agriculture Center (CEAC) at the University of Arizona
- Green roof
- Greenhouse
- Hydroponics
- Integrated floating cage aquageoponics system
- Organic engineering systems
- Science Barge
- Seascraper
- Urban agriculture
- Vertical farming
