= Keep Growing Detroit =

Non profit organization

Keep Growing Detroit is an organization dedicated to food sovereignty and community engagement in the cities of Detroit, Hamtramck, and Highland Park. Founded in 2013, the program designs and implements initiatives that promote the practice of urban agriculture as a mode of food justice for underrepresented communities, particularly those who do not have access to healthy food options. The goals of Keep Growing Detroit are to educate and empower community members using urban agricultural practices. Programs such as the Garden Resource Program and Grown in Detroit served as catalysts, laying the foundation for Keep Growing Detroit.

Keep Growing Detroit has over 70 seasonal, high tunnel gardens, and operates out of a central farm located in the Eastern Market District. At the central farm, transplants and seeds are grown and distributed to gardeners in their network, and workshops are hosted for any interested community members. Keep Growing Detroit is responsible for providing these essential garden resources to over 1,550 gardens. The organization aims to combat the prevalent issue of food insecurity that exists within Detroit. By emphasizing community engagement, leadership opportunities, and agricultural education, Keep Growing Detroit enables participants to establish agency over the way they obtain their food.

== History ==
=== Pretext for founding ===
In the 20th century, Detroit was considered an example for technological advancement thanks to the automobile industry. However, due to economic decline, the city is no longer a standard for modernization and is currently an example of urban decay. The decline of Detroit is well documented: the city entered a recession prior to the Great Recession, posting deficits of up to $150 million annually starting in 2005. This debt has resulted in increased crime and poverty rates, and a rapidly decreasing population due to white flight.

Detroit has also been the birthplace of many cultural movements such as the Civil Rights Movement and the Black Power Movement. People of color in Detroit experience low access to food and health care, and low access to employment and education. Pertaining solely to food, communities of people of color that live in food deserts are vulnerable to cardiovascular diseases, obesity, and diabetes. A lack of health care increases these risks. There are many organizations and initiatives that aim to address these issues by working towards a food sovereign Detroit.

=== Urban agriculture ===
Detroit's urban agriculture initiatives are well established compared to others in the United States. Because of the need for reliable and healthy food sources, Detroit shows potential for the expansion of urban agriculture from a neighborhood level to a city level.

Many urban gardens increase segregation by displacing people of color; however, the urban agriculture initiative in Detroit is unique because many of the urban farms are headed by people of color. Keep Growing Detroit is directly involved by promoting agricultural education and increasing access to agricultural resources to communities of color.

=== Food sovereignty in Detroit ===
Detroit has been listed under the Food Access Research Atlas (FARA) as a low income and low food access region. Detroit is considered a food desert because of the lack of access to fresh produce and grocery stores, with many residents relying on fast food chains, liquor stores, and corner stores to feed themselves and their families. Grocery stores began closing in the 1980s, and Farmer Jack was the last chain grocery store to close in 2007. Some argue that Detroit's food desert status is no longer an issue; however, Keep Growing Detroit aims to directly address remaining issues of food insecurity.

=== Founding ===
Keep Growing Detroit was founded in 2013 to organize, maintain, and support already existing food programs-the Garden Resource Program and Grown in Detroit, and to ultimately reach more urban farmers. Ashley Atkinson, the co-director of Keep Growing Detroit, stated in an interview from 2015, "I see [the programs] growing tenfold in order to accommodate hundreds more gardens and residents participating. We really must not slow down in pursuit of our mission of a food sovereign City of Detroit."

== Structure ==
Keep Growing Detroit was co-founded by Ashley Atkinson in 2013. The organization is divided into subsets with their own distinct initiatives. The base of Keep Growing Detroit is located on 1850 Erskine. The Garden Resource Program is a KGD initiative that provides resources to local residents for creating and maintaining gardens, even assisting in growing plant cuttings for transplantation. The transplants are given to residents to use for their gardens. Other programs sponsored by Keep Growing Detroit include: Grown in Detroit, Produce for Pantries, Education Series, Urban Roots, Sweet on Detroit, Detroit Farm Train, Youth Programs, and Early Childhood Programs. Grown in Detroit, which has a CSA and a food stand in the Eastern Market farmers market, aims to connect residents with locally grown produce, that is grown without the use of GmOs or pesticides.

== Funding ==
=== Grants ===
The Health Fund is one of several organizations that supplies grants to Keep Growing Detroit in support of its initiatives and actions towards community building and food sovereignty. Additional supporters are the Mahindra North American Technical Center, Wayne State University, and USDA Natural Resources Conservation Services.

=== Community Food Project ===
KGD receives funding as a Community Food Project (CFP). The Community Food Projects are funded federally through the U.S. Community Food Security Act of 1996. According to the National Institute of Food and Agriculture (NIFA) CFP's aim to:

"Meet the food needs of low-income individuals through food distribution, community outreach to assist in participation in Federally assisted nutrition programs, or improving access to food as part of a comprehensive service; Increase the self-reliance of communities in providing for the food needs of the communities; Promote comprehensive responses to local food access, farm, and nutrition issues; and Meet specific state, local or neighborhood food and agricultural needs...".

KGD provides agricultural resources for new gardeners and farmers, and opportunities for financial growth through selling produce at various farmers markets.

== Membership ==
As a member of Keep Growing Detroit one gains access to a large variety of seeds and transplanted plants. "Under the program, families pay a $10 annual fee to receive 26 seed packets, 124 vegetable transplants, and discounts on educational programs. School gardens receive the same resources for $20 per year. Community and market gardens pay $20 per year to receive 78 seed packets and 364 transplants. The transplants are grown and distributed by volunteers at two locations in the city. Participants who volunteer a minimum of 2 hours of their time receive additional benefits such as compost, access to garden tools and soil testing." Members of Keep growing Detroit gain access to the Garden resource program plant varieties official document. This document outlines all the available plants a member is able to purchase from the organization as seeds or transplants. A table in the document outlines the basics of what the grower would be given to plant through certain packages that pertain to specific membership criteria. Every plant is labeled "F=family garden, S=school garden, C=community garden, M=market garden" these different labels present how much of any plant each type of garden is permitted. Additionally, there are four sections of seeds/transplants: Spring seeds, Hot crop transplants and seeds, cold crop transplants and fall crop transplants and seeds. Within these sections, The Keep growing Detroit 2018 Garden Resource Program Plant varieties document has a wide variety of plant options for each season. This is an important document for KDG members for it is what they are interacting with to obtain the plant materials they desire.

== Agricultural initiatives ==
There are four prominent urban agriculture initiatives that have occurred within Detroit. These are the Greening of Detroit, Earthworks, Detroit Black Community Food Security Network and Michigan Urban Farming Initiative. Keep Growing Detroit is mentioned as a collaborator with two of these prominent urban agriculture organizations: Earthworks and Detroit Black Community Food Security Network. Keep Growing Detroit collaborates with Earthworks by using them as a contracted grower to grow transplants that Keep Growing Detroit then distributes to thousands of their community garden members. Along with this, Earthworks organizes youth and adult programs five times a week in which they educate attendees on environmental awareness, growing food, healthy nutrition, and cooking/food preparation. The adult program goes a step further and teaches people farming skills they can apply to their own urban agriculture project. This education plays an important role in Earthworks relationship to Keep Growing Detroit. Their goal is the education obtained through this partner program will foster future KGD members. This will be useful to Earthworks who is the contracted grower for Keep growing Detroit, to maintain this relationship. Additionally, Keep Growing Detroit works with Detroit Black Community Food Security Network to organize workshops, community training activities, and the moving of produce. The Detroit Black Community Food Security Network was responsible for developing a food security policy for Detroit in 2006. In an attempt to move toward food sovereignty in Detroit. By 2008 the city council passed a resolution on the development of Detroit Food Policy Council. The foundation that was laid within this council acted as a platform from which Keep Growing Detroit could develop their mission toward urban agriculture.

== Community outreach initiatives ==
Since its founding, Keep Growing Detroit has operated several programs that work towards providing Detroit community members with access to sustainable agricultural practices and resources. Serving the primarily black food justice network, the programs work together to support black Detroit community gardeners, in hopes of reestablishing equity within the food system.

=== Garden Resource Program ===
The Garden Resource Program has supported most of the gardens in Detroit, providing necessary tools and education practices for those wishing to benefit from the urban gardens. The program directly provides residents, particularly communities of color, with specific gardening workshops and necessary resources. The program was launched in 2003 by Ashley Atkinson, co-director of Keep Growing Detroit. The program provides means for community members to examine the history of their gardening practices, incorporating their own levels of personal resilience through their work.

=== Grown in Detroit ===
Grown in Detroit culminates the food, herbs, and other garden resources that originate from urban gardeners from Detroit, Hamtramck, and Highland Park. The initiative provides food to several restaurants around the city, and provides workshops for residents interested in becoming Grown in Detroit gardeners.

=== Produce For Pantries ===
Produce for Pantries is one of the subsets of KGD created to address the food desert crisis in Detroit. It is donation based. The donations are then given to pantries in need.

=== Educational programs ===
Keep Growing Detroit offers educational programs and workshops for all ages. The programs educate locals on the basics of garden maintenance, production, as well as leadership skills to promote the growth of urban gardening practices. The educational programs for KGD are supported by the Michigan Health Endowment Fund, an organization that values the attention towards student apprentices involved in KGD The student apprenticeships aim to provide community instruction and leadership opportunities to youth and young adults in the Detroit area. The educational components of Keep Growing Detroit focus on the ideals and properties of food sovereignty within the city. The programs educate Detroit residents in order to promote practices of self-determination, celebrating urban agriculture as a necessary skill as well as a way of creating community.

==== Sweet on Detroit Bee-ginner Beekeeping Program ====
Established in 2007, this program specializes in teaching the art of beekeeping for those maintaining community gardens within the city. The program is taught in a 6-part series, educating potential beekeepers in general bee biology and proper control and maintenance of their hives.

==== Urban Garden Education Series ====
KGD offers classes to community members in the area, focusing on educating locals in the basics of gardening and maintaining produce. The classes are advertised online on their website, updated with each season.

Each class is designed to educate members of all ages and levels of experience. The programs cover a broad range of topics, including preservation of gardens, plant growth, and ways to sustainably harvest and eat the products.

=== Youth programs ===
KGD offers a paid, 8-week summer work experience, aimed to provide apprenticeship experience to youth ages 14–18 in Detroit. Following their apprenticeship experience, KGD offers the Academic Year Youth Leadership Development Program, which assists students as they move onto adult leadership roles. KGD also offers early childhood programs for children from birth to five years old. The programs incorporate interaction and play amongst families and neighbors in Detroit, in efforts to start building healthy habits from a young age.

=== Leadership initiatives ===
KGD provides several initiatives aimed to provide access to healthy diets as well as to encourage communal leadership and decision-making skills amongst Detroit residents. Supported by co-founder Ashley Atkinson, leadership workshops are led throughout the organization in order to organize the community in response to the politics of food sovereignty in Detroit. The leadership within KGD connects with other groups in Detroit combatting food sovereignty, in the overall push towards expansion of community gardening within the city.

The Urban Roots Community Garden Leader Training Program is a specific 9-week program geared towards training leaders around Detroit in areas such as horticulture and community organization. The program educates students in horticulture methodology, and prepares graduates to continue on into further leadership roles in their neighborhoods. This program joins the city-wide movement towards food security. A network of urban gardening organizations is educating more residents in areas of leadership in order to increase the growing accumulation and success of produce amongst the vacant lots of Detroit.

== Political involvement ==
Keep Growing Detroit strives to use urban agriculture in parts as a tool to improve food sovereignty, economic opportunities, and the quality of life in Detroit through political engagement and community involvement.

=== Land security ===
The urban agriculture movement taking place in Detroit is heavily influenced by the availability of land in the surrounding area. Access to land is one of the few requirements that can hold citizens back from beginning their journey to food sovereignty. Many Detroit residents took to starting their own gardens in neighboring vacant lots. Gardening in this manner does not provide any long term security for the garden itself, and it could be disrupted by the legal land owners. Keep Growing Detroit is a community leader in helping residents to secure land for their agricultural endeavors. They provide people with the necessary information and methods to go about securing their own land. Keep Growing Detroit's approach to land security is flexible with various options for a variety of different level enthusiasts. They highlight 4 different ways to go about acquiring land, including oral licensing, written licensing, leasing, and purchasing.

=== Detroit Food Policy Council ===
Starting with its inauguration in 2009 by the Detroit City Council, the Detroit Food Policy Council has worked closely with Keep Growing Detroit. The council is involved in monitoring, advising, and implementing decisions concerning food policy in Detroit. These actions include reviewing and updating food security policies, participating in the development of urban agriculture and land security policies, and publishing the Detroit food system report.
