= Food Policy Council =

A Food Policy Council or Food Board is an organization which enables citizens to influence food policy, generally on a local level. The concept originated in the United States, where the first council was founded in Knoxville in 1982 to battle the effects of an economic recession on the local food supply system.

Food Policy Councils bring together different stakeholders that want to work on making healthy, local and sustainable food available for people in a certain region. In this way the councils connect representatives of consumers, producers, NGOs and governments to find solutions suitable to their region.

The idea of local councils of this type has spread across North America and to other continents.

In Brazil a national Food Policy Council called CONSEA (Conselho de Segurança Alimentar e Nutricional) was established in the 90s. It was very successful in reducing the number of people affected by hunger and undernourishment. In 2019 President Jair Bolsonaro disbanded CONSEA on his first day in office to give the agrobusiness sector more power over the Amazon.

== Examples of Food Policy Councils ==
- Kamloops Food Policy Council founded in 1995
- Knoxville-Knox County Food Policy Council
- Toronto Food Policy Council founded in 1991
- New York State Food Policy Council founded in 2007

== See also ==
- Community-based economics
- Food security
