= New York State Food Policy Council =

To address the prevalence of food deserts and diet-related illness in the U.S. state of New York, and to promote sustainable, Local food, the New York State Food Policy Council was founded on May 20, 2007 by Governor Eliot Spitzer's Executive Order No. 13. The council coordinates state agriculture policy and makes recommendations to the governor regarding policies that will ensure the availability of safe, fresh, nutritious, and affordable food for New Yorkers. While focusing on increasing access to healthy food options for low-income residents, seniors, and children, the council also works to promote New York agricultural products to New York consumers, with a special emphasis on expanding the consumer market for organic food.

In addition to coordinating food policy, the council will develop a strategic plan to ensure access to affordable, fresh, healthy, nutritious food and expand agricultural production, especially locally grown and organically grown food. The sale of organic food is an emerging market, with more than $13 billion spent on organic food in 2005.

In January 2011, under Executive Order No. 2: Review, Continuation and Expiration of Prior Executive Orders, Gov. Cuomo approved the continuation of Spitzer's Executive Order No. 13: Establishing the New York State Council on Food Policy.

== Members ==
The council includes 21 representatives from all areas of the food system, including the heads of the following six agencies: Agriculture, Health, Office of Temporary and Disability Assistance, Aging, Economic Development, and the Consumer Protection Board. Other members are appointed by the governor and include the dean of the New York State College of Agriculture and Life Sciences; 1 farm organization representative; 1 school food administrator; 1 consumer representative; 2 food assistance organization representatives; 1 nutritionist; 1 anti-hunger advocate; and 3 representatives from the food industry at large. There will also be four appointed positions for members with experience and expertise related to agriculture, nutrition or food policy that will be recommended by the Temporary President of the Senate, the Speaker of the Assembly, the Minority Leader of the Senate, and the Minority Leader of the Assembly. With its members announced on September 19, 2007, they included

- Linda Bopp, executive director of the Nutrition Consortium of New York State
- Bruce Both, president of the United Food and Commercial Workers Union; Local 1500
- Michael Burgess, director of the Office for the Aging
- Dr. Richard Daines, commissioner of the New York State Department of Health
- Raymond Denniston, food service director of the Johnson City Central School District and Co-Chair of the New York State Farm to School Coordinating Committee
- Diane Eggert, executive director of the Farmers Market Federation of New York
- John Evers, executive director of the Food Bank Association of New York State
- Daniel Gundersen, upstate chair of Empire State Development Corporation
- David Hansell, commissioner of the Office of Temporary and Disability Assistance
- Dr. Susan Henry, dean of Cornell University's College of Agriculture and Life Sciences
- Richard Mills, commissioner of the State Education Department
- Cathryn Mizbani, senior extension administrator and WIC program coordinator of the Cornell University Cooperative Extension of Schenectady County
- William Rapfogel, executive director and chief executive officer of Metropolitan Council on Jewish Poverty
- Irwin Simon, founder, chairman, president and chief executive officer of the Hain Celestial Group, Inc.
- Julie Suarez, director of public policy for the New York Farm Bureau
- Mary Warr Cowans, RD, CDN, and associate director of the Division of Nutrition at the New York State Department of Health
- Eleanor Wilson, corporate dietician for Price Chopper Supermarkets, Inc.
- Catherine Young, New York state senator

== Public hearing ==
Given a need to gather input from New York citizens, the council has undertaken a "listening tour" in which members have engaged with New Yorkers through public hearings around the State. Citizen input gathered through the tour will help the council formulate policy initiatives and can be found online.
