= Detroit Black Community Food Security Network =

American grassroots community organization

The Detroit Black Community Food Security Network (DBCFSN) is an urban, community-oriented, predominantly black, grassroots food justice group. The organization was initiated by a communal desire to start an organic garden collective, and has grown from its founding in 2006 with over 50 Detroit residents as members. In an effort to combat food insecurity and increase food sovereignty, DBCFSN established a community accessible food farm in 2008, known as D-Town Farm, which grows over 30 types of fruits and vegetables on seven acres of land.

The goal of the organization is to increase food security and sovereignty within Detroit's black population. It formulates efforts to provide communal access to spaces where food is healthy, available, and affordable. DBCFSN uses community activism, alliance building and educational programs to highlight various structures which perpetuate the inequality of black communities in present-day Detroit. Currently, DBCFSN is working to establish the Detroit People's Food Cooperative, with the goal of opening by mid-to-late 2019.

== History ==
=== Pretext for founding ===
Following the 1950s city demolition of Black Bottom and Paradise Valley for highway construction, the residents of Detroit increased the presence of the Black Power Movement, and the Civil Rights Movement, throughout the 1960s. By 1967, Pastor Albert Cleage, founder of the Central United Church of Christ, later named the Shrines of the Black Madonna of the Pan-African Orthodox Christian Church, founded the Black Star Market, the first black communal cooperative business. The co-op closed within two years, but started forming the framework for much of DBCFSN's work. Mayor Coleman Young of Detroit developed and implemented the Farm-A-Lot program in 1975 to encourage urban agriculture in the city, but the impact of this effort faded at the turn of the century.

Outside and foreign investors, white flight, and the collapse of the automobile industry have made it difficult for local Detroit residents to own land, a reflection of the trend since 1910 of African American land ownership. The 1980s of Detroit maintained a trend of supermarket closures, with Farmer Jack, the last chain grocery store in Detroit in 2007. Years before the United States 2008 financial crisis, Detroit entered a recession. After the country-wide recession struck, Detroit's depression worsened, which resulted in increases in unemployment, crime, and poverty levels.

One third of Detroit residents do not own automobiles and many passengers of public transportation wait an hour at bus stops. The low economic status of the city is illustrated by the following statistics: 30% of Detroit's residents remain unemployed, and 36% live in poverty. Additionally, the Food Access Research Atlas (FARA) has designated Detroit as a low income and low food access region. Classified as a food desert, 80% of Detroit residents rely on "fringe food" provided by fast food chains, liquor stores, and corner stores. To address food insecurity, the city of Detroit has launched the Detroit Agricultural Network (DAN) in 1997, and the Garden Resource Program in 2004, later named Keep Detroit Growing in 2013. The Detroit Food and Fitness Collaborative is an overarching group of 40 organizations, including Keep Growing Detroit and the Detroit Food Justice Task Force. The organizations work to ensure that children and families have access to healthy, locally-grown food, and they work to promote healthier life styles. The city is also one of nine communities across the country to receive assistance from the W.K. Kellogg Foundation in efforts to promote community involvement and growth in ensuring lifestyles of health and fitness. The W.K. Kellogg Foundation promotes the idea that all children should have equal opportunity to live and thrive, focusing on communities where children and families are vulnerable. Communities within Detroit utilize these efforts along with several other organizations to address the growing issue of poverty, and to spread awareness of the impacts that these social issues can pose.

=== Founding ===
In 2000, Malik Yakini, principal of Nsoroma Institute Public School Academy charter school, worked with staff, parents and supporters (including Anan Lololi of the Afr-Can FoodBasket from Toronto) to implement organic gardening and to develop a food security curriculum. The garden grew to form the Shamba Organic Garden Collective (SOGC), where faculty and parents plotted and maintained 20 gardens in backyards and vacant lots. "Groundbreakers" took on the role of tilling gardens for community members who were unable to do so. The founding meeting of DBCFSN occurred in 2006 when Yakini assembled a group of 40 community members strongly connected to food at the Black Star Community Bookstore. This would have not been possible without the organizations effect in influencing public policy. People such as JoAnne Watson and council man Kwame Kenyatta were crucial characters in connecting this cause to the people within the Detroit City Council who eventually approved the food security policy. The specific policy in which DBCFSN is particularly concerned is "the Right to Farm act." This states no higher power has authority to create laws and regulate agriculture in their area. This is an important case for DBCFS because they need to refrain from breaking any laws and regulations while carrying out the mission to develop healthy urban agricultural systems.

The group discussed the need for black community involvement in urban agriculture, as well as food justice, security and sovereignty. The newfound Detroit Black Community Food Security Network began gardening on a quarter-acre plot of land in Detroit's east side, quickly moving to a half-acre plot in Detroit's westside. In 2008, DBCFSN secured a long-term lease on seven acres of property in Rouge Park, establishing D-Town Farm as the city's largest community run farm. Currently, DBCFSN operates the D-Town Farm, The Food Warriors Youth Development Program (under the leadership of Education and Outreach Director Hanifa Adjuman) and is opening the Detroit People's Food Cooperative in 2019.

== Structure ==
Detroit Black Community Food Security Network has more than 70 members, of which 80% are women, including individuals, seven families, and one organization. The D-Town Farm maintains one full-time employee, five part‐time farmers, and around ten internships annually. Many of the members are lifelong "Detroiters". Members of DBCFSN generally identify with Black Nationalism and political analysis from the Black Power Movement, and have been engaged with community involvement in prior experiences.

== Framework ==
DBCFSN extends the legacy of the Black Freedom Movement, attributing foundational ideas to those of Ida B. Wells, Malcolm X, Fannie Lou Hamer, Rev. Albert B. Cleage and others .

DBCFSN aims to transform the city of Detroit by encouraging African Americans to take control of their food system. DBCFSN models community and self-determination, and they direct youth into food related fields. They maintain a policy framework that aims to eliminate barriers preventing African-American land ownership, and redistribute wealth through co-operative communal ownership

== Land ownership ==
=== 2006-2008 ===
Upon their formation, DBCFSN acquired use of a quarter-acre plot of land near the 4-H Club on McClellan in the Eastside of Detroit in 2006, and the land was purchased by a developer in the fall of that year. In June 2007, the organization acquired use of a half-acre plot of land owned by the Pan African Orthodox Christian Church.

=== 2008: $1 lease ===
After 2 years of planning and meetings with the Detroit City Council and the City Planning and Recreation Department, DBCFSN acquired a temporary 10-year license agreement to use a designated two-acre site in the City of Detroit's Meyers' Tree Nursery in Rouge Park for $1 annually. In 2010, the site expanded from two to seven acres, becoming the permanent placement for the D-Town Farm. The lease expires in 2018.

== Funding ==
Between 2006 and 2010, DBCFSN was funded solely through membership dues and contributions of members and supporters. The D-Town Farm hosts an annual Harvest Festival which attracts local and regional supporters by the hundreds. In 2010, the organization received funding from the W.K. Kellogg Foundation, one of the top 3 U.S. funders of sustainable agriculture and the alternative agri-food movement.

In 2015, the Greening of Detroit and DBCFSN collaborated to receive a USDA Beginning Framers and Ranchers Grant to train new farmers in Detroit. In 2016, DBCFSN, along with six other healthy food businesses, received a grant from Michigan Good Food Fund. Funding has also come from various USDA grants, as well as the Fair Food Network, Metabolic Lab, Capital Impact Partners, Detroit Economic Growth Corporation, City Connect and Whole Foods Market.

== Agricultural initiatives ==
=== D-Town Farm ===
This program began in the crop season of 2006, but became officiated in 2008 with the acquisition of land in Rogue Park. The structures implemented on the seven-acre plot include several hoop houses, in-ground vegetable plots, composting sites, an apple orchard and a bee-keeping operation. During the 2010 growing season, they produced upwards of 37 crops, including acorn squash, zucchini, kale, collards, tomatoes, basil, green beans, cabbage, watermelon, pumpkins, beets, turnips, and radishes. The D-Town farm is operated by volunteer communal DBCFSN members who assist the farm in selling the crops to various farmers markets.

=== Ujamaa Food Co-operative Food Buying Club ===
This co-operative, operated by DBCFSN from 2008 to 2016, provided community members with an alternative place to buy household goods, bulk items, healthy foods and supplements for an affordable price. The word "Ujamaa" comes from the Swahili term for "collective economics". The Ujamaa Food Buying Club works with the Uprooting Racism, Planting Justice Program. in forming anti-racism dialogues in Detroit. There are currently 100 members of the Ujamaa Food Co-op in the Detroit metro area. This system alleviates the issue for these 100 members to shop primarily at fringe food retail stores.

=== Detroit People's Food Co-operative ===
DBCFSN has been working since 2010 to launch the Detroit People's Food Co-operative in 2018, although the opening date has since been changed to 2019. The co-op intends to increase community ownership and food access among Detroit's Historic North End's residents. The co-op is expected to introduce over 20 jobs to the area, with aspirations of 1,200 community members joining the program.

=== Detroit Food Commons Project ===
Malik Yakini and DBCFSN are currently working on a project named the Detroit Food Commons Project. It will be 30,000 square feet, and will feature the Detroit People's Food Co-op mentioned above, a local cafe, kitchen, and meeting rooms for DBCFSN and the local community. Because the project is so large in scale, there have been some difficulties getting it together. This project has been worked on for seven years.

== Political involvement ==
The roots of DBCFSN trace back to the U.S. Civil Rights Movement and the Black Power Movement within Detroit. The organization operates under a food sovereignty policy framework, guided by principles including food as a human right, agrarian reform, protection of natural resources, reorganization of food trade, ending hunger, peace and democracy.

The Public Policy Committee of DBCFSN presented the draft at a public forum during their September 2007 Harvest Festival. The City Council of Detroit unanimously passed the Detroit Food Security Policy bill on March 25, 2008. The bill includes plans for developing a food system analysis database for Detroit, undertaking data collection on hunger and malnutrition, formulating recommendations for alternative food systems such as urban agriculture, creating citizen education guidelines, and producing an emergency response plan in the event of a natural disaster.
