= Organic engineering systems =

Organic engineering systems (OES) are organic, hydroponic, aeroponic or aquaponic farming technologies that are designed as a building engineering system. The main purpose of these technologies is to grow food in buildings. OES are agricultural technologies and are considered a sub-section of ecological engineering, primarily because they mimic natural ecosystems to produce food and are defined as urban horticulture.
