= Integrated floating cage aquageoponics system =

The Integrated Floating Cage Aquageoponics System (IFCAS) was developed as an aquaculture-horticulture based on the concept of integrated farming system approach firstly in Bangladesh in 2013 to produce fish and vegetables in floating condition where waste materials (fish feces and unused feed) from fish culture dissolved in the pond water and settled on the bottom mud are used for vegetables production. Of the newly adopted term aquageoponics, aqua, geo and ponics means water, mud/soil and cultivation, respectively. In fact, aquageoponics is a new version of traditional aquaponics where soil is used as a medium instead of conventional media such as hydroton, pebbles, and sponges.

== Development process of IFCAS ==
Filling the gap of supply and demand of fish and vegetables for improving household nutrition, the ANEP (Agriculture and Nutrition Extension Project) funded by the European Union (EU) works in Barisal District of Bangladesh following an integrated aquaculture-agriculture approach. Pond dykes in Barisal are commonly used for planting trees by the rural people which provide cooking fuel, fruits, and timber for sale. Trees on the pond dyke create shadow, which reduce sunlight penetration to the edges of the pond and the dykes. In this context, IFCAS was developed in the shaded ponds without changing the vegetative nature of pond dykes following the collegial principles of action research. In the whole process of action research, farmers, researchers and developers from Bangladesh Agricultural University (BAU), Mymensingh, Patuakhali Science and Technology University, Bangladesh, WorldFish-ANEP, and Bangladesh Fisheries Research Forum (BFRF) together were involved in the trial of this technology. The concept of IFCAS was developed by Dr. M. Mahfujul Haque (Ripon), Professor, Department of Aquaculture, BAU, Mymensingh who led the action research as the Principal Investigator.

== Technical aspects ==
A 9 m^{2} rectangular iron-bar made structure was constructed, having four concave grooves in its four corners for holding floats of plastic drums. The whole bottom of the structure was surrounded by a rectangular nylon net cage with the dimensions of length-3.66 m × width-2.44 m × depth-1.25 m. Under the four corners and middle points of the net, half-brick weights were hung to ensure that the net retained a rectangular structure under the water. In the middle of both widths of IFCAS, two pits filled with dried pond mud of the same pond are used as medium for vegetable plantation. On the top of the structure, a scaffold was made using split bamboo and net for vegetables to climb on.

== Benefits ==
Compared to other aquaculture technology, IFCAS showed several benefits to the adopting farmers. Like traditional aquaponics, fish and plants also rely on each other in aquageoponics. Here a mutual relationship exists between fish and plants. Unused fish feed and excrements result in nitrogenous wastes in the pond water and mud what are used as nutrients (nitrate) by the plants in IFCAS. Here some substrates such as, fallen leaves from horticulture plants, mud and materials in IFCAS (such as drums, iron plates etc.) harbour the nitrifying bacteria what convert toxic ammonia to less harmful nitrate. Plant roots hanging from IFCAS pits, absorb nutrients more effectively from water than plants do in traditional soil based agriculture as roots are longer and healthier in IFCAS. Like in aquaponics, plants grow faster in IFCAS also. Moreover, symbiotically plants facilitate by providing fish with ammonia free water in return. Harvesting fish and vegetables from IFCAS is very easy for both men and women. Apart from consumption of fish and vegetables at the household level, farmers earned money by selling fish from IFCAS. IFCAS is not only useful in the small shaded ponds but also in multi-ownership ponds, state-owned ponds, natural water bodies (beel), rivers, canals, and the waterlogged areas affected by climate change. Along with dissemination of this technology in Bangladesh, IFCAS has been trialed in ponds in Nepal which was found encouraging for nursing fish fingerlings and vegetables during dry season.

IFCAS reduces the use of chemical fertilizers or supplementary diets to grow vegetables and fish.

== Stocking density and production ==
Professor Dr. M. Mahfujul Haque, the leading researcher of the IFCAS project, recommends a stocking density for monosex Tilapia of 100 fry per cubic meter. For vegetables, cucumber, bean, bitter melon, Asian spinach etc. are recommended. Tilapia production of 31 kg and 52 kg per 9 m^{2} were found within 120 days of period in the IFCAS placed heavily shaded and moderately-shaded ponds, respectively. On-station and farmer participatory on-farm research works are underway focusing suitable fish species combination in the cage of IFCAS to determine its optimum productivity potential.

== See also ==
- Fish farming
- Integrated multi-trophic aquaculture
- Aquaponics
