= Lufa Farms =

Canadian urban agricultural company

Coordinates: 45.53162°N 73.65559°W

- Type: Private
- Founded: 2009
- Headquarters: Montreal, Quebec, Canada
- Key people: Mohamed Hage (Founder, CEO); Kurt Lynn (Founding Member, Vice President); Lauren Rathmell (Founding Member, Greenhouse Director); Yahya Badran (Founding Member, Director of Engineering); Dave Furneaux(Chairman)
- Products: Subscription-based food ecommerce
- Number of employees: 200
- Website: montreal.lufa.com

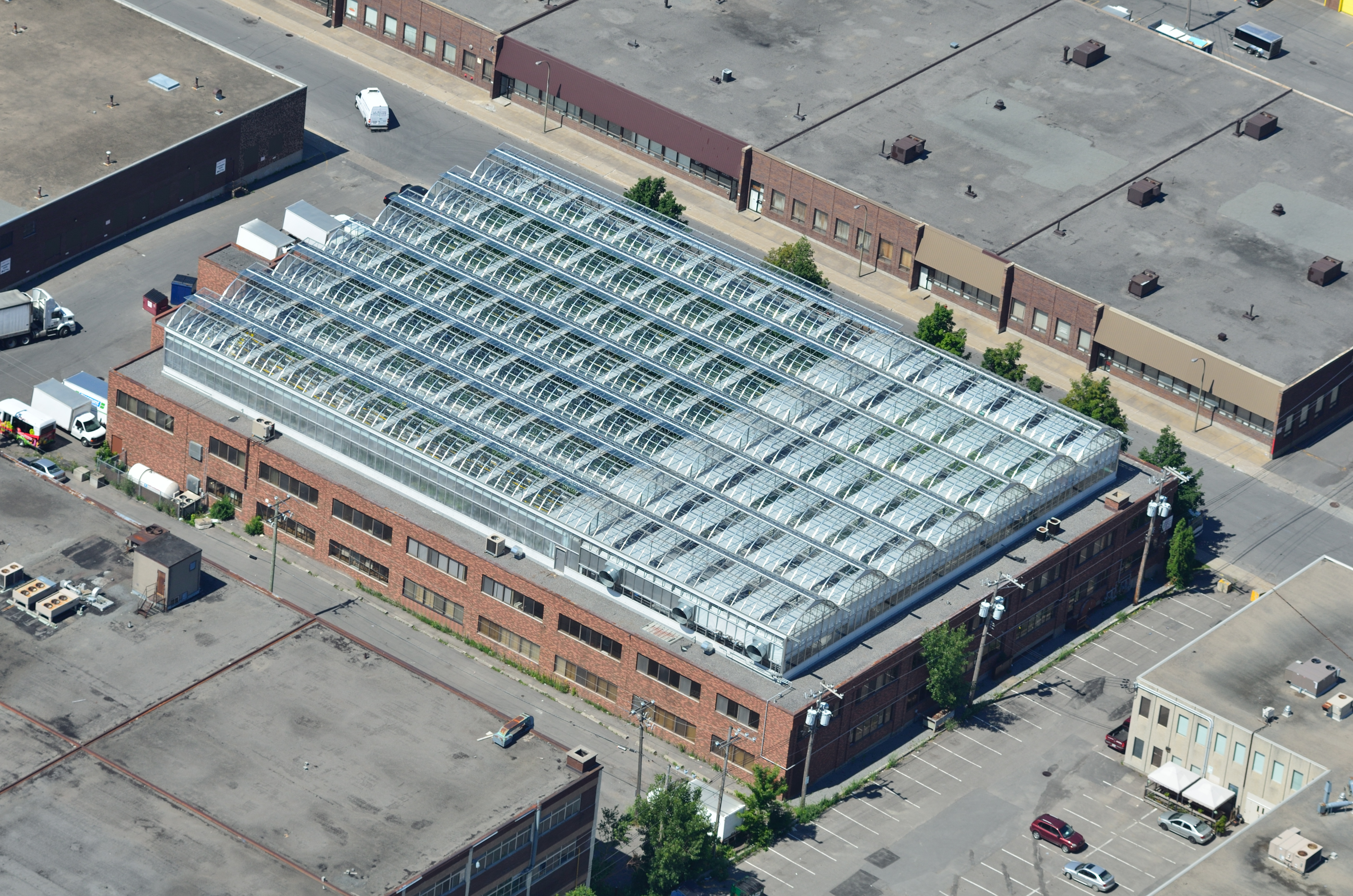
Montreal greenhouse

Lufa Farms is an urban agricultural company located in the Ville Saint-Laurent neighborhood of Montreal, Quebec. The company states its mission is to "grow food where people live and grow it more sustainably". The company, founded in 2009, has installed commercial greenhouses on the rooftops of several large industrial buildings and a commercial building in the greater Montreal area.

== Description ==
Mohamed Hage, founder of Lufa Farms, talks to Silver Donald Cameron.

Lufa Farms states on its website a goal of building a "better food system". The company claims it achieves its goal by growing more food closer to where people live, while using less space and resources to minimize environmental impacts.

With five rooftop greenhouses in the Montreal area, the company currently has 427,800 square feet of growing space where over 50 of types of vegetables are grown. The company currently delivers around 20,000 baskets every week to over 500 pick-up points across Quebec.

== History ==
The company was started by Mohamed Hage, inspired by the rooftop gardens in Lebanon. Lauren Rathmell, Kurt Lynn, and Yahya Badran were also involved in the founding.

Lufa Farms opened its first commercial rooftop greenhouse in the Ahuntsic borough of Montreal. The greenhouse had 31,000 square feet of vegetable production and housed the company's herb, micro-greens, cucumber, and pepper production using both horizontal and vertical farming systems.

=== 2011 ===
The company harvested its first rooftop vegetables and began delivering weekly baskets to its first customers. The company grew 15 varieties of vegetables and delivered them to about 200 customers.

=== 2013 ===
Lufa Farms built their second rooftop greenhouse in the neighboring city of Laval, measuring 43,000 square feet. They partnered with hundreds of local farmers and food makers to offer Lufa Farms' rooftop-grown vegetables, as well as thousands of seasonal field fruit and vegetables, baked-to-order bread, seafood, and more. These partnerships brought the launch of the company's online farmers’ market, the Marketplace.

=== 2016 ===
The company went through a period of growth. The total number of weekly baskets exceeded 10,000 and the company subsequently doubled its workforce. Home delivery by electric car was launched and the company became cash-flow positive.

=== 2017 ===
Lufa Farms built its third rooftop greenhouse in the Anjou suburb of Montreal. This greenhouse, which was both their largest and most technologically advanced at the time, grew the company's growing space to 138,000 square feet.

=== 2019 ===
The company moved their main offices and distribution centre to Ville Saint-Laurent where they began construction on their fourth rooftop greenhouse.

=== 2020 ===
The company finished the completion of their Ville Saint Laurent greenhouse in the spring of 2020.The greenhouse measures 164,000 square feet and reached full production in August 2020.

=== 2024 ===
Lufa Farms opened its fifth rooftop greenhouse, covering 127,000 square feet on top of the new Marché Central Walmart and Decathlon in Ahuntsic, Montreal. Built in partnership with KUBO Greenhouse Projects, QuadReal Property Group, and FDA Construction, the site is the company's most technologically advanced farm.

== Farming techniques ==
Lufa Farms grows its crops on rooftops. In its operations, it uses a coconut fiber substrate using a hydroponic system. Water is recirculated and rain and meltwater are added into the closed-loop system.

Lufa Farms does not use synthetic herbicides, fungicides, or pesticides. It relies primarily on bio-controls consisting of the introduction of predatory insects.

Green waste is composted and sold on Lufa Farms' Marketplace or is sent to municipal or other partner composting sites.

== Gallery ==
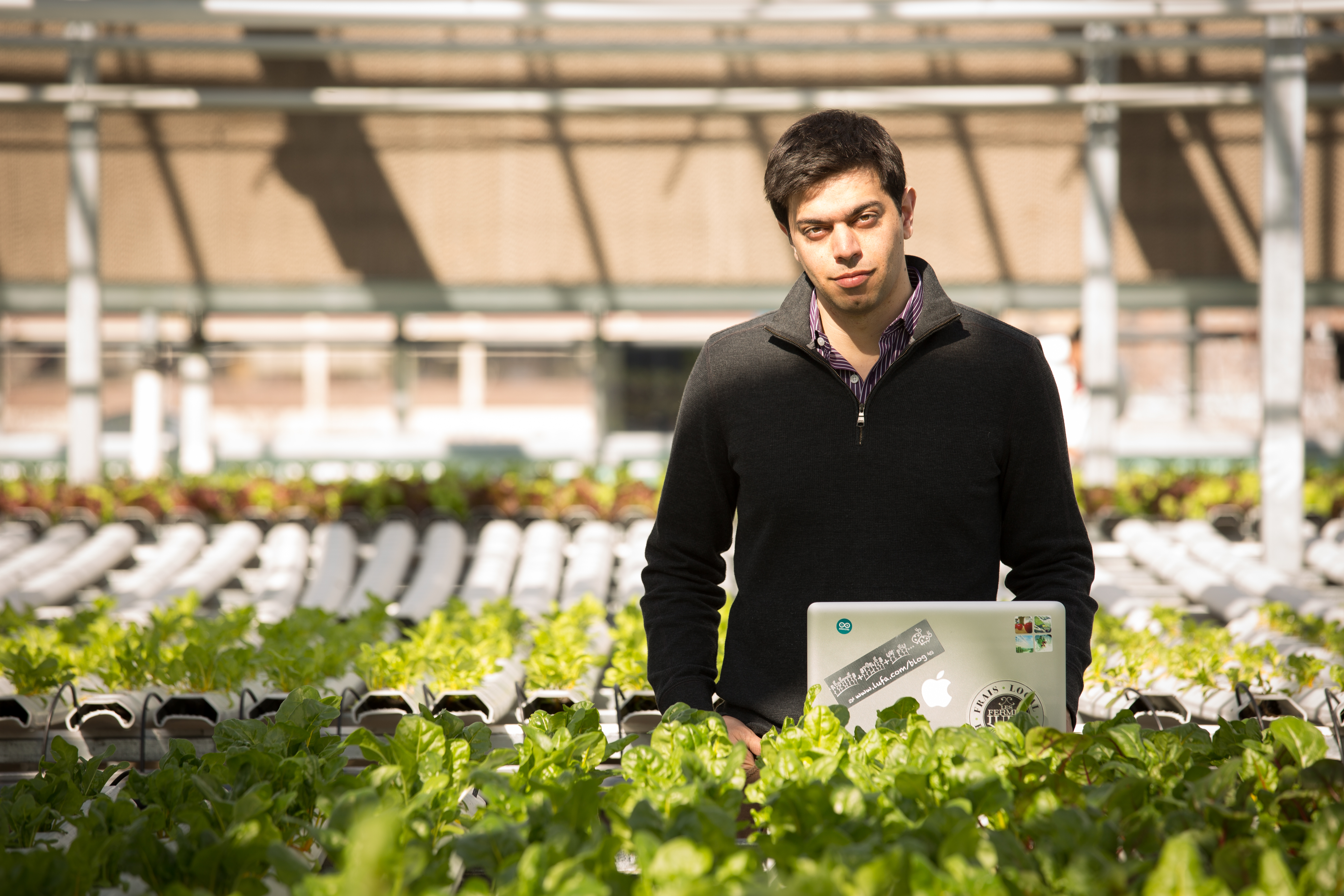
Mohamed Hage, founder of Lufa Farms

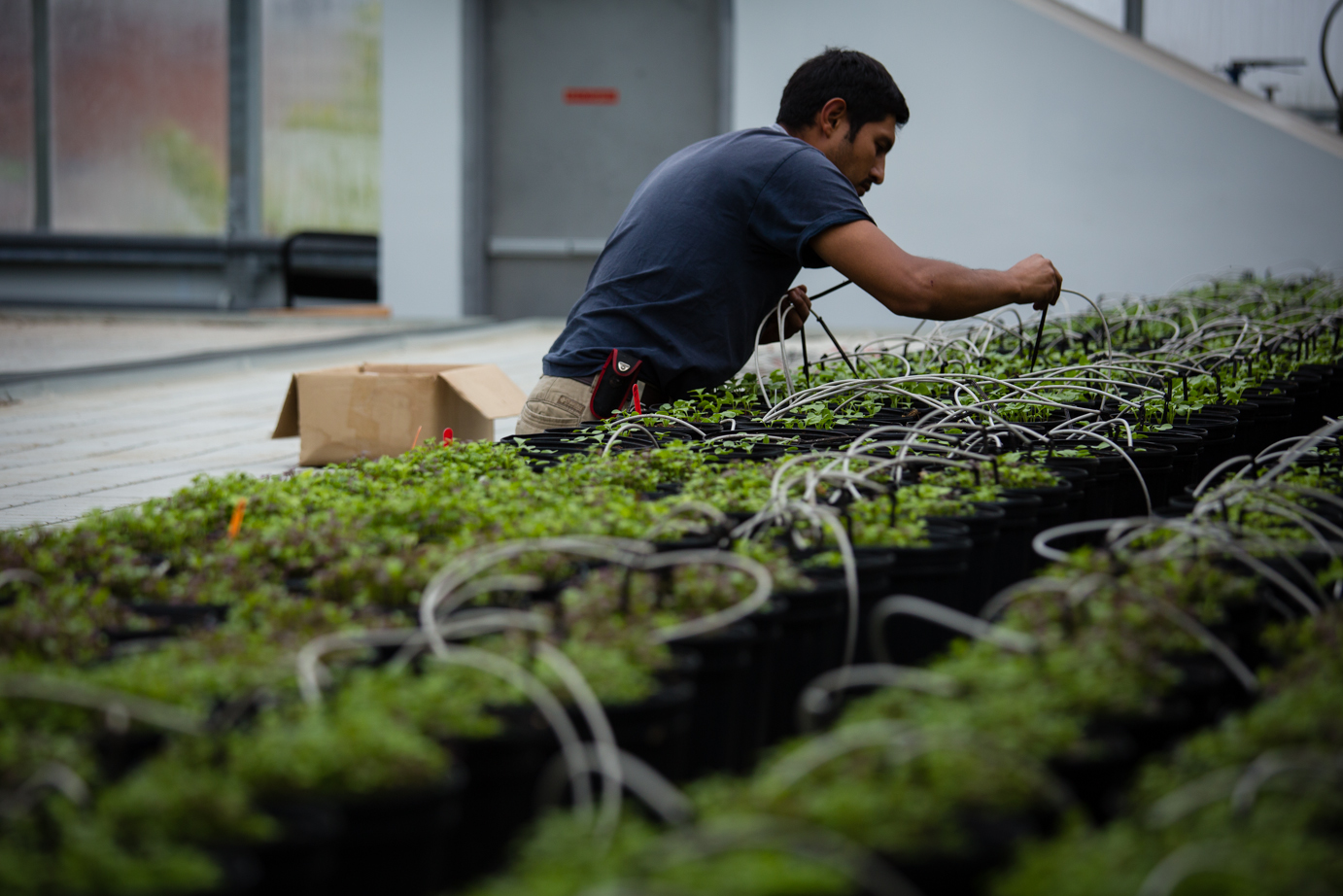
Plant science team member

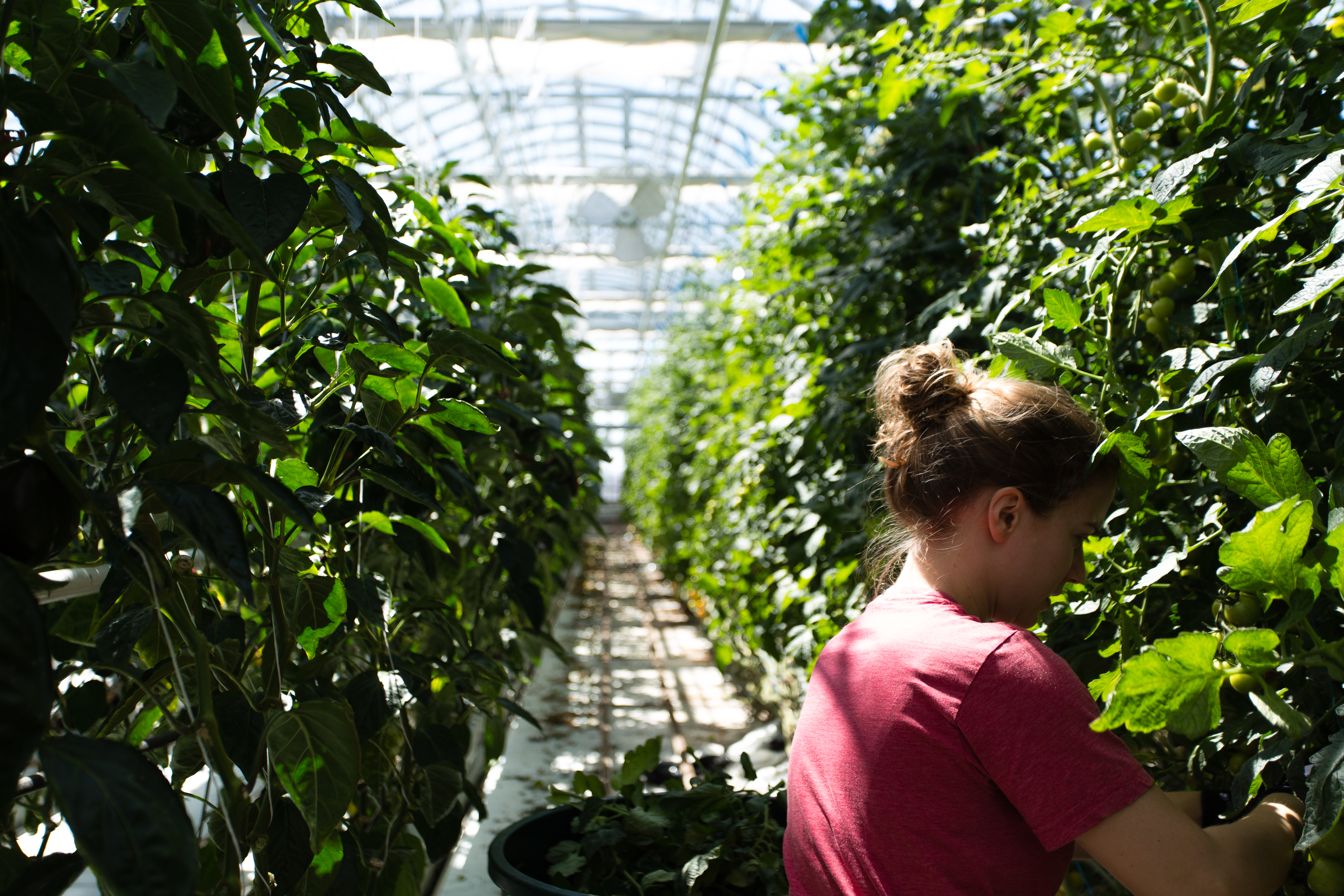
Vegetables harvest

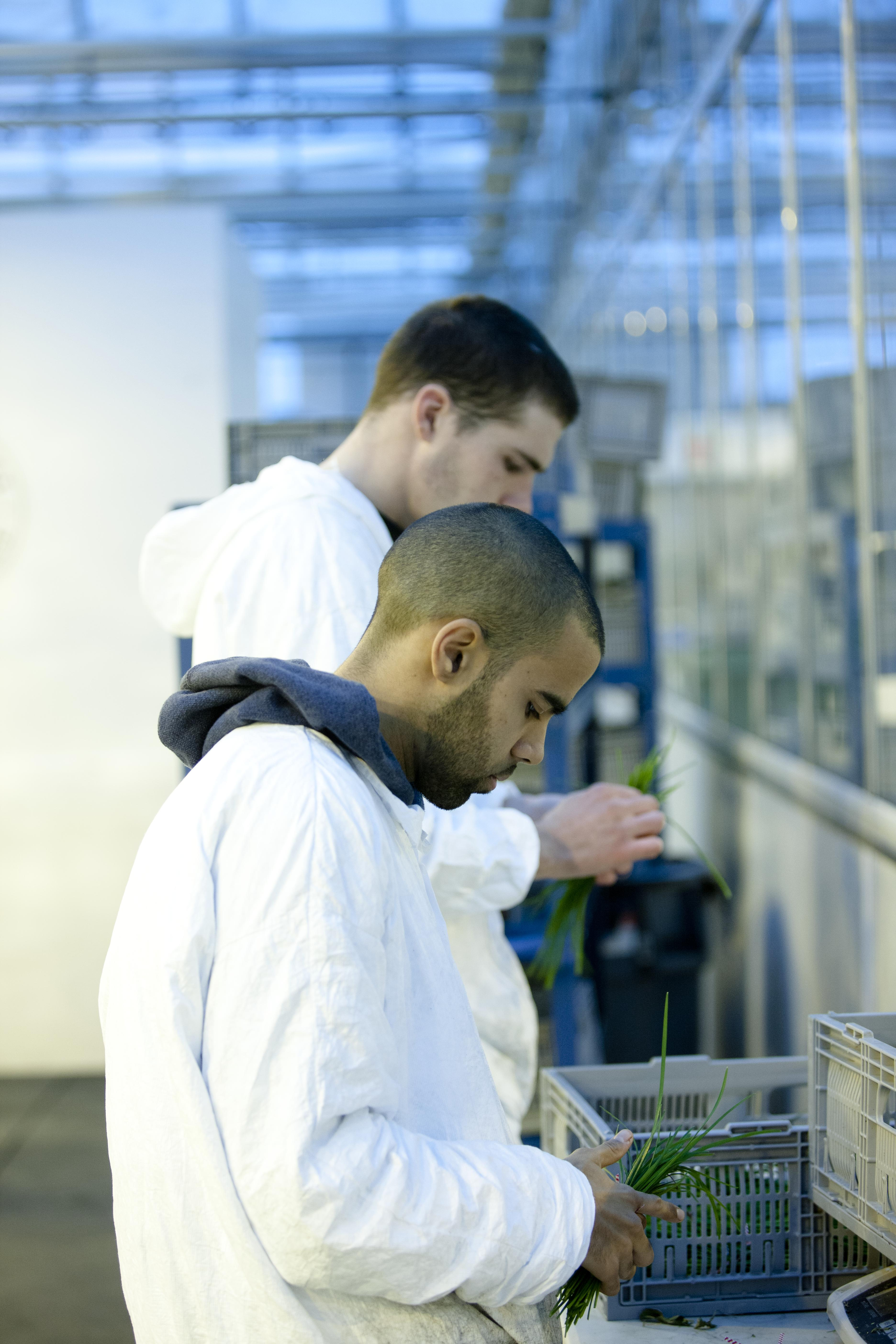
Preparation of vegetable baskets

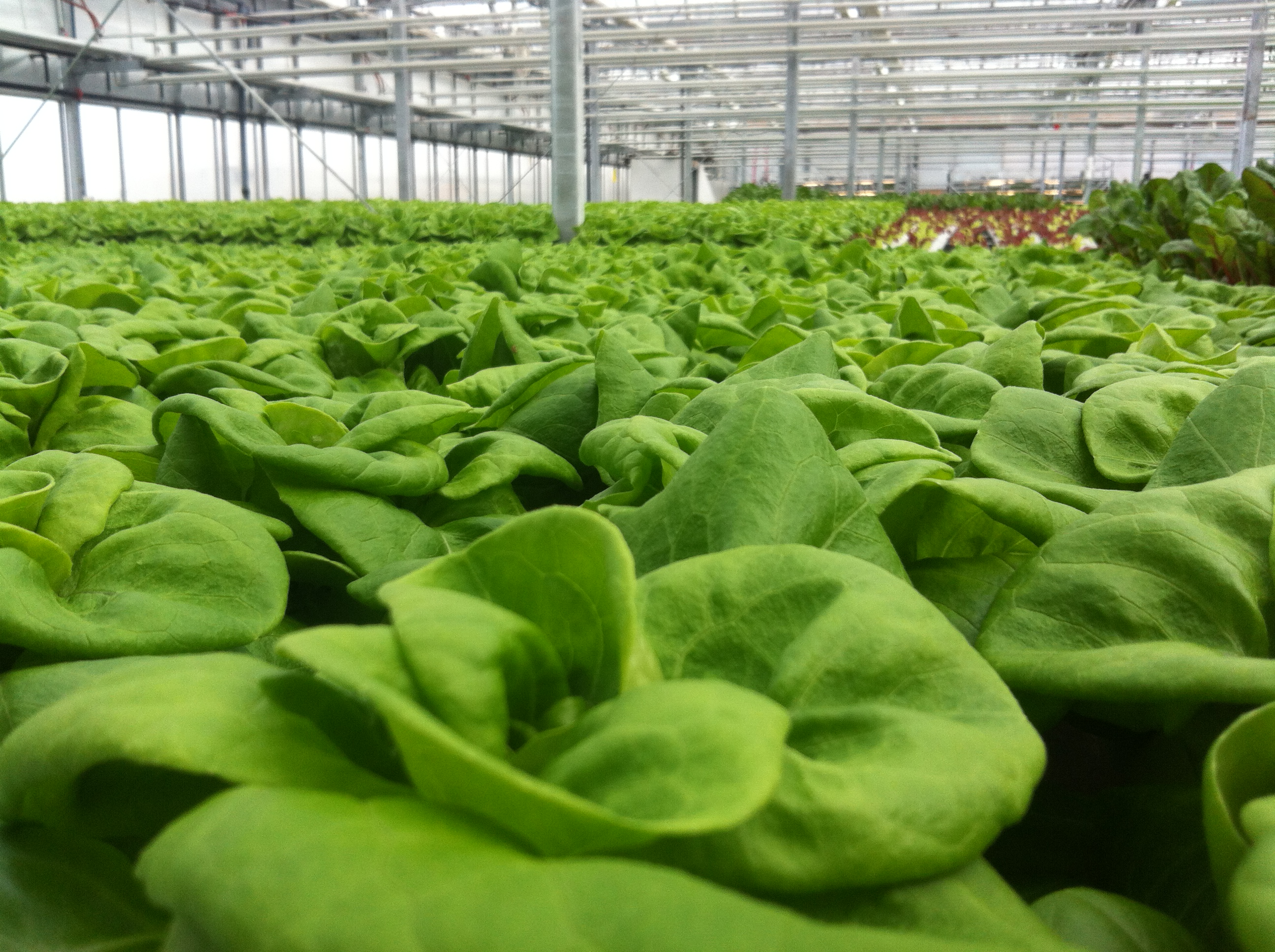
Boston lettuce

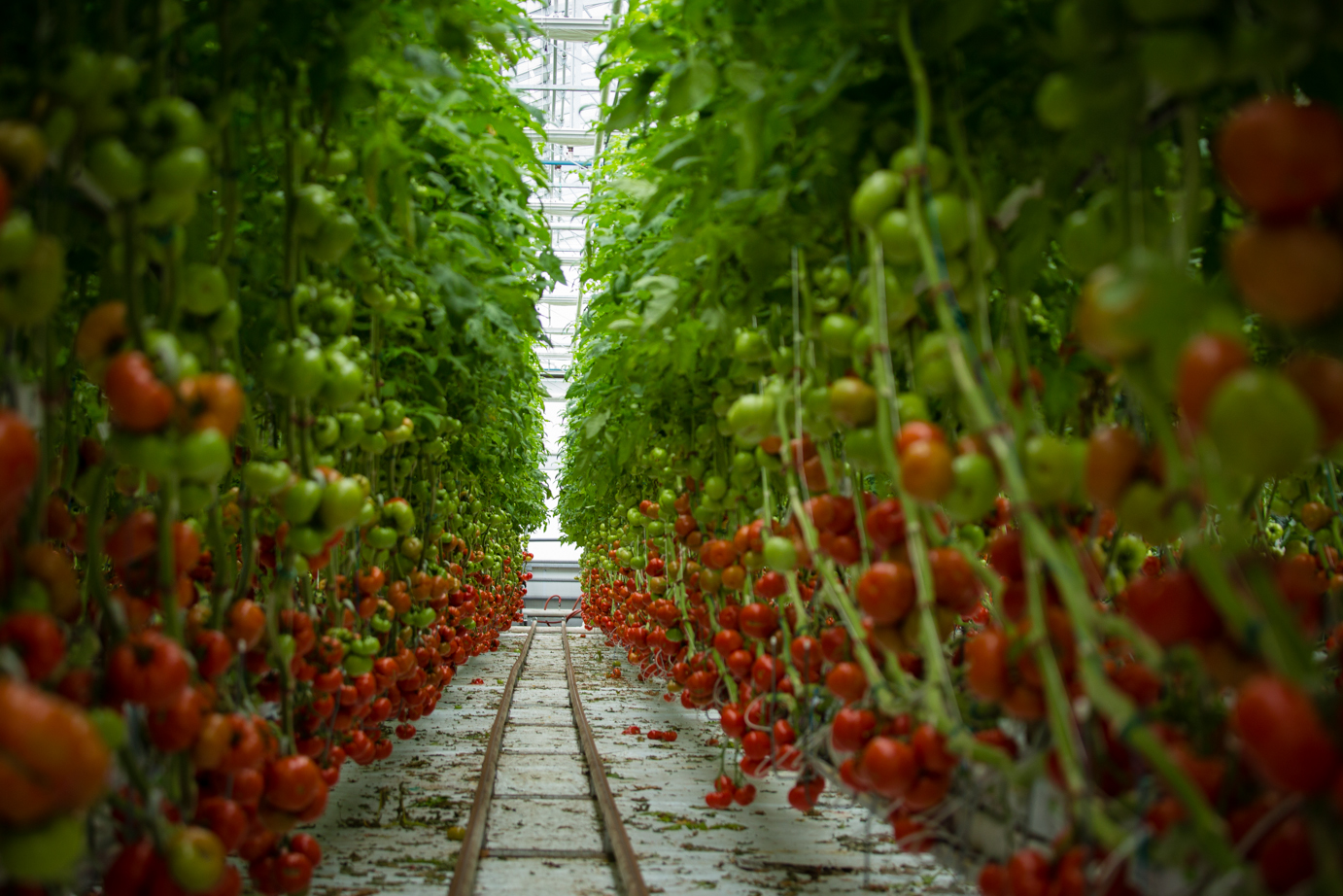
Tomato rows

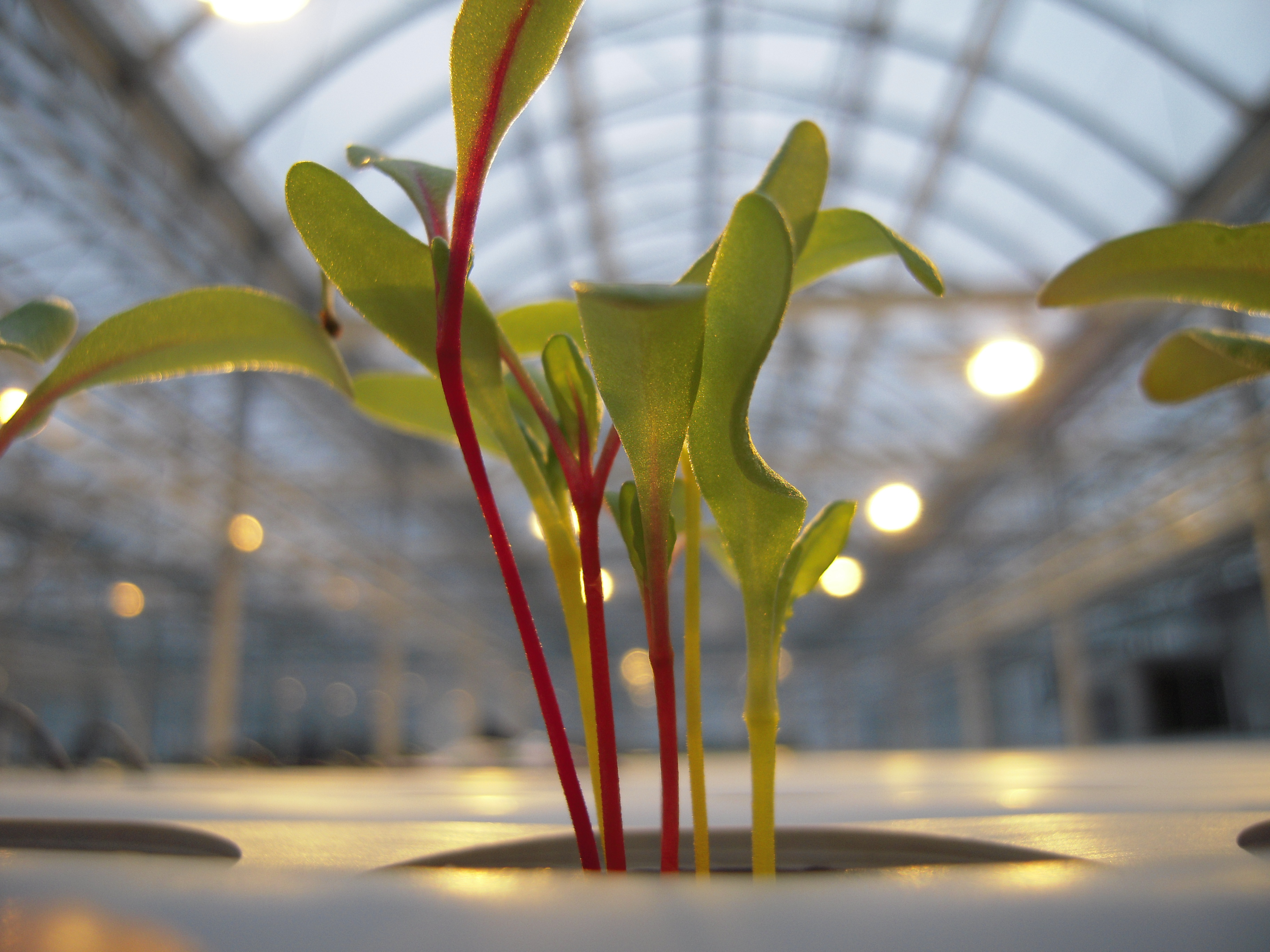
Chard Growing in nutrient film system

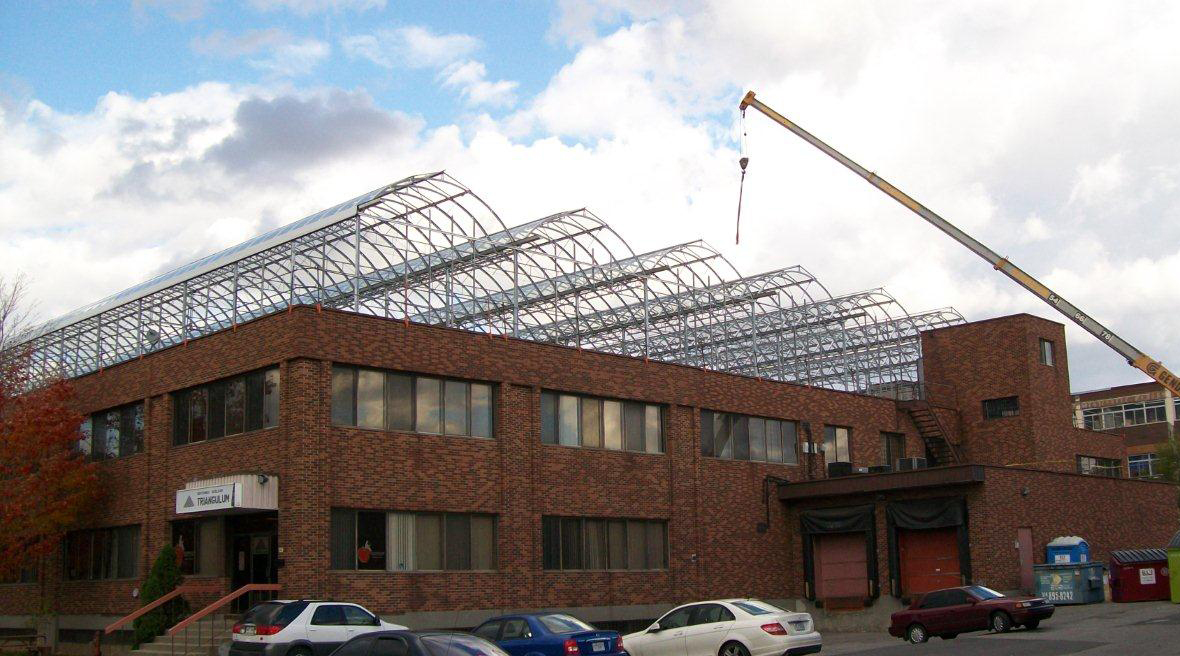
Construction of the first greenhouse in Montreal, Quebec (2011)

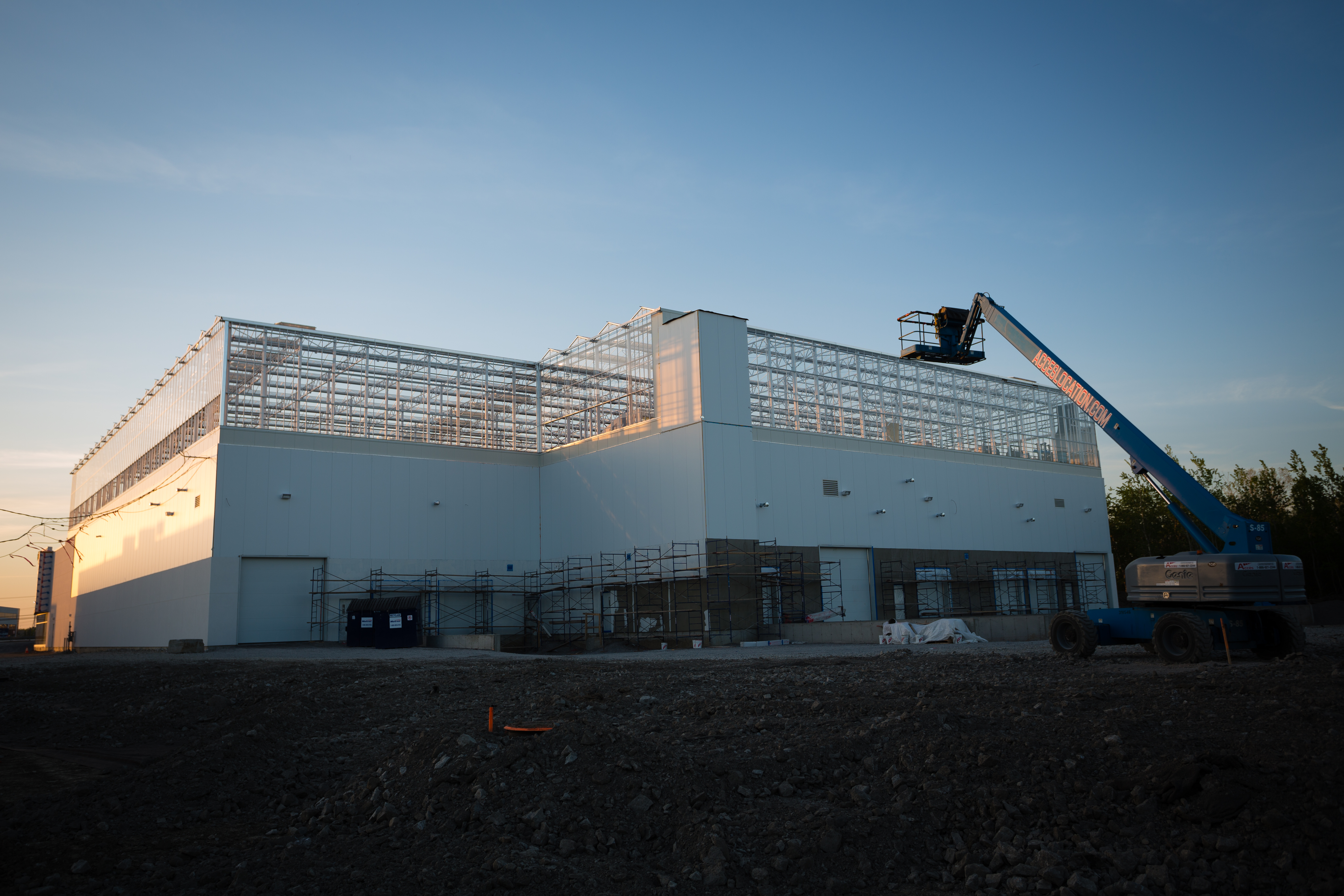
Construction of the new greenhouse in Laval, Quebec (2013)

== See also ==
- Controlled-environment agriculture
- Roof garden
- Building-integrated agriculture
- Hydroponics
