= Susan Henry =

American geneticist

Susan Henry (born Susan Armstrong, June 27, 1946 – March 7, 2026) was a professor of molecular biology and genetics at Cornell University, and formerly the Ronald P. Lynch Dean of the College of Agriculture and Life Sciences. She is best known for her work in the genetic regulation of lipid metabolism in yeast.

== Biography ==
Henry earned a Bachelor of Science from University of Maryland in 1968 and PhD from University of California, Berkeley in 1971. She died on March 7, 2026, aged 79.

== Selected works ==
- Lastovetsky, O. A., Gaspar, M., Mondo, S. J., LaButti, K. M., Sandor, L., Grigoriev, I. ., Henry, S. A., & Pawlowska, T. E. (2016). Lipid metabolic changes in an early divergent fungus govern the establishment of a mutualistic symbiosis with endobacteria. PNAS: Proceedings of the National Academy of Sciences of the United States of America. 113:15102-15107.

== Awards and distinctions ==
- Award for Distinguished Service to Agriculture – New York Farm Bureau (2010)
- Alice H. Cook and Constance E. Cook Award honoring "individuals who deserve recognition for their commitment to women's issues and their contributions for changing the climate for women and minorities at Cornell – Cornell University (2013)
- Avanti Award for Lipids (2013)
- Distinguished Service Citation – New York State Agricultural Society (2013)
