= Gotham Greens =

American indoor farming company

- Type: Private
- Founded: 2009
- Founders: Viraj Puri, Eric Haley
- Headquarters: New York City, United States
- Key people: Viraj Puri (CEO), Eric Haley (CFO), Jenn Frymark (Chief Greenhouse Officer)
- Products: Agribusiness
- Website: gothamgreens.com

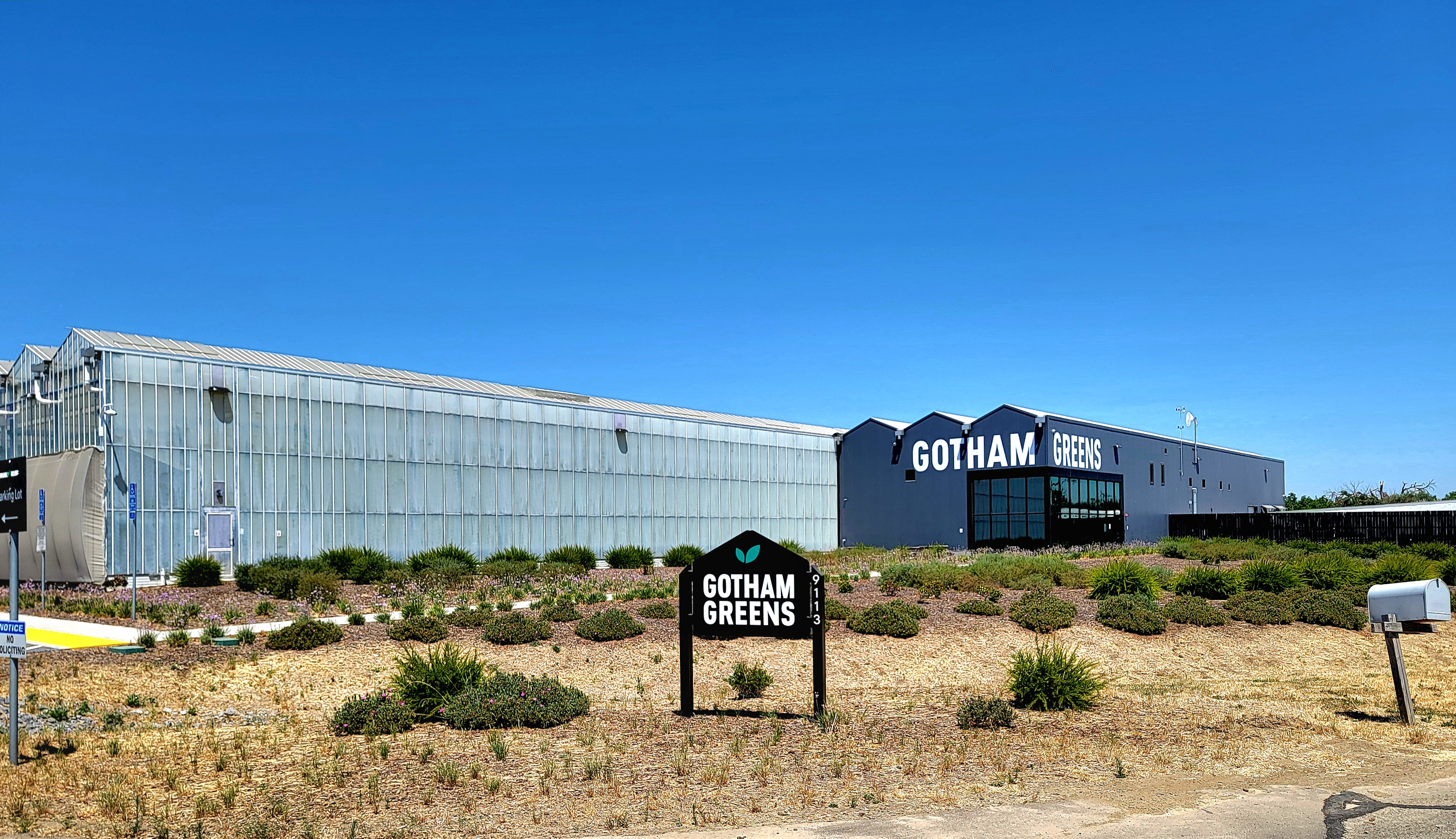
Gotham Greens in Davis, California

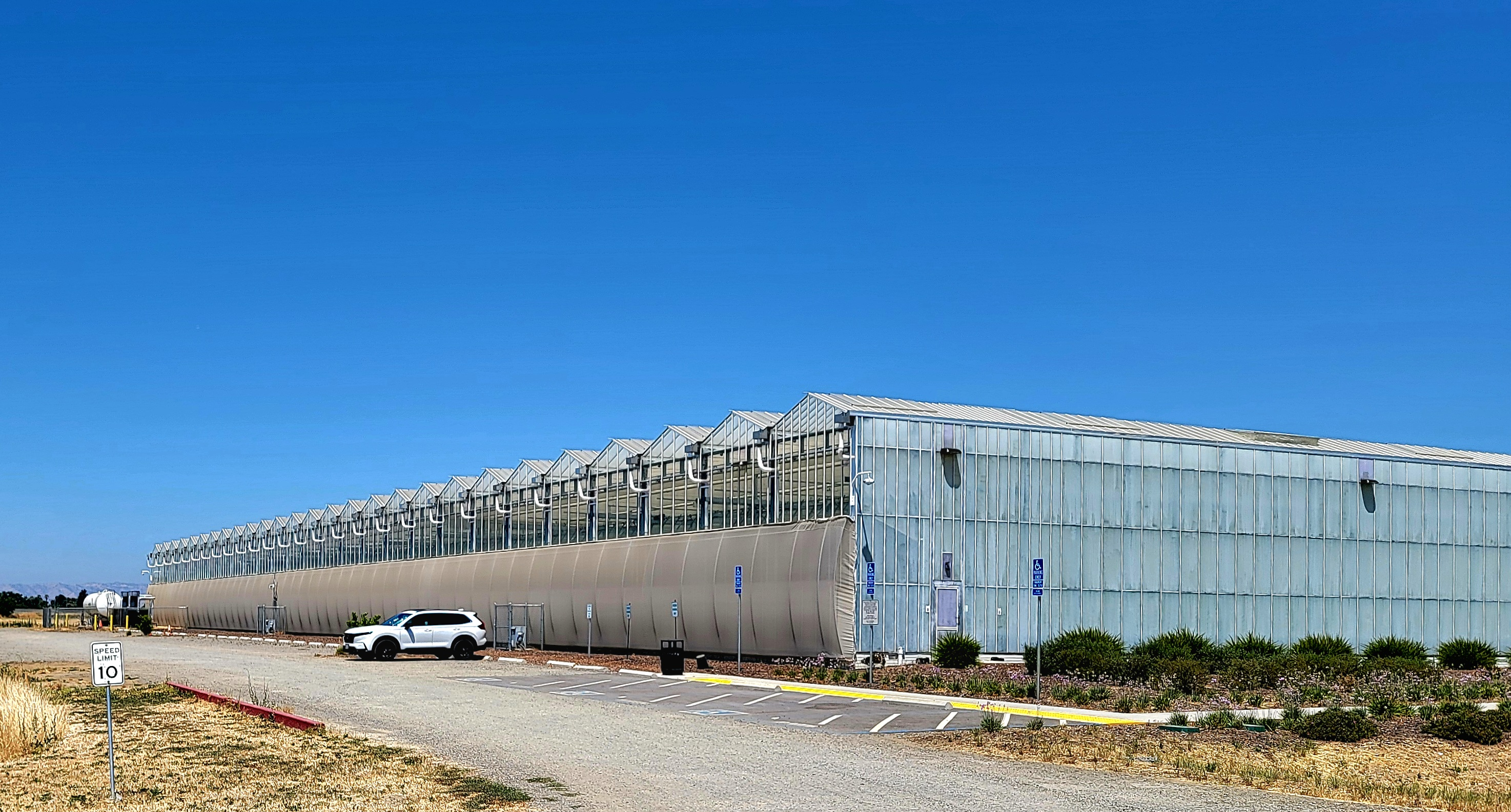
Another view of the Gotham Greens facility in Davis, California

Gotham Greens is an American fresh food and indoor farming company founded and headquartered in Brooklyn, New York City, that grows local produce year-round in greenhouses, with its lettuces, herbs, salad kits, salad dressings, dips and cooking sauces sold under its brand name.

The company owns and operates 13 hydroponic greenhouse facilities in the United States, totaling more than 1.8 million square feet. The CEO of the company is Viraj Puri.

== History ==
Gotham Greens was founded by Viraj Puri and Eric Haley in 2009, aiming to bring fresh, local and pesticide-free produce, grown using sustainable methods, to cities across the United States. Puri has a sustainable development and environmental engineering background, and Haley has a banking and finance background and focuses on the business side of the venture. The company is headed by Puri, Haley and Jenn Frymark, who joined in 2009 to lead greenhouse operations.

After three years of planning, in May 2011 Gotham Greens opened its first location, a 15,000 square-foot greenhouse in Greenpoint, Brooklyn, that was reported to be the first commercial urban rooftop greenhouse in the United States. However, commercial greenhouses on rooftops have existed in New York City since at least since 1969, when Terrestris rooftop nursery opened on 60th Street in Manhattan.

By controlling the environment, Gotham Greens can grow up to 30 times more leafy greens per acre than conventional open-field agriculture. Its greenhouses use up to 90% less water and 97% less land in comparison to conventional open-field farming methods.

The company opened its second location in 2013, a 20,000 square-foot greenhouse, atop a Whole Foods Market in Gowanus, Brooklyn; its third in 2015, a 75,000 square foot greenhouse in Chicago, Illinois, the largest rooftop greenhouse in the world; and its fourth location, a 60,000 square-foot greenhouse on the rooftop of the former Ideal Toy Company factory in Jamaica, Queens, in late 2015. At the end of 2019, Gotham Greens opened 100,000 square-foot greenhouse facilities in Chicago, Edgemere, Maryland, and Providence, Rhode Island. In 2020, the company opened a 30,000 square-foot greenhouse in Aurora, Colorado. In 2021, the company announced it expanded to the West Coast with the opening of a 100,000 square-foot greenhouse in Davis, California, and that it became a Certified B Corporation. In 2022, Gotham Greens announced the purchase of FresH2O Growers, based in Stevensburg, Virginia, with a 540,000-square-foot hydroponic greenhouse facility. In 2023, Gotham Greens added an additional 600,000 square feet with expansions at existing facilities in Chicago and Providence, Rhode Island, and three new greenhouse facilities in Windsor, Colorado; Monroe, Georgia; and Seagoville, Texas.

In 2021, the University of California Agriculture and Natural Resources (UC ANR) and the UC Davis College of Agricultural and Environmental Sciences (UCD CAES) entered into a partnership with Gotham Greens to advance research and innovation in the areas of indoor agriculture, advanced greenhouse technology and urban agriculture.

The company was recognized by Whole Foods Market as part of its Top Food Trends for "Ultra Urban Farming" in 2022 and "Clean & Conserve: Water Stewardship" in 2024.

In April 2026, Gotham Greens announced a change in its leadership. Co-founder and chief executive officer Viraj Puri became Executive Chairman, and Craig Stevenson was appointed CEO. The transition took place as the company continued to expand its operations in the United States.

== Funding ==
In 2020, Gotham Greens raised $87 million series D funding round led by Manna Tree with participation from the Silverman Group, bringing the company's total financing to $130 million. In 2022, the company raised an additional $310 million, led by BMO Impact Investment Fund and Ares Management, bringing its total financing to $440 million.

== Products ==
Gotham Greens produce and fresh food products, including pesto sauce and salad dressings, are sold in grocery stores under its brand name, and also sold to restaurants and food service companies. In September 2022, Gotham Greens released a line of plant-based, dairy-free, gluten-free, non-GMO dips. In November 2023, Gotham Greens launched a line of salad kits.

== Greenhouse locations ==
- New York City – three facilities (Greenpoint, Brooklyn; Gowanus, Brooklyn; Jamaica, Queens)
- Chicago, Illinois – two facilities (Pullman)
- Edgemere, Maryland
- Providence, Rhode Island
- Aurora, Colorado
- Davis, California
- Stevensburg, Virginia
- Windsor, Colorado
- Monroe, Georgia
- Seagoville, Texas

== See also ==
- Controlled-environment agriculture
- Urban agriculture
- Roof garden
- Building-integrated agriculture
- Hydroponics
