= Gardening in restricted spaces =

There are many ways to garden in restricted spaces. Often a small or limited space is an issue in growing and cultivating plants. Restricted space gardens can be located on small lawns, balconies, patios, porches, rooftops, inside the home, or in any other available place. Gardening in small places can be applied to edible or floral plants.

Successful gardening in small or restricted spaces requires careful planning to maximize the use of available area. Key considerations include timing of planting, the use of trellising and staking to grow plants vertically, and proper spacing of raised beds or containers to optimize plant growth and yield.

== Square foot gardening ==
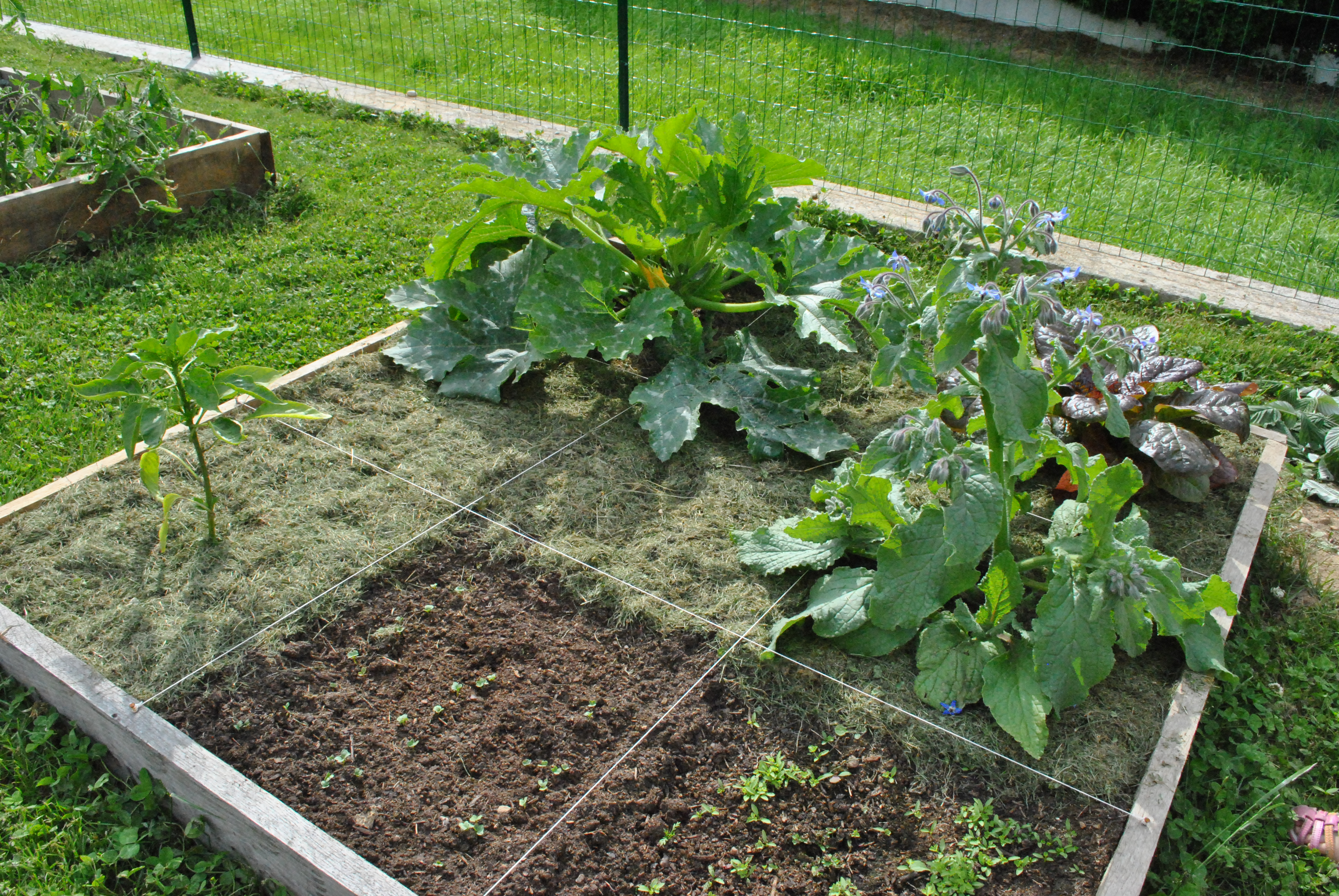
Square foot garden

Square foot gardening was made popular by Mel Bartholomew in the early 1980s. He has written multiple books, appeared on various television shows, and even has a website about the subject. The basic idea of square foot gardening is to have a box of equal length and width and divide this box into one square foot areas; the original design was a six to eight inches deep with four foot sides divided into 16 squares.

The box can be placed on the ground or on supports so that those who can not bend as easily or for long periods can garden as well. Boxes placed on supports need a bottom. Boxes placed on the ground do not need a bottom; however, having a weed blocker is recommended. Even if the box is placed on the ground, the existing soil condition is irrelevant because it is not used. It is recommended to fill the box with Mel's Mix. Mel Bartholomew created this mix and claims it never has to be replaced. To make it, combine compost (homemade or five different kinds of store bought), peat moss, and coarse vermiculite in equal parts by volume. After the soil is in the box, use string, stakes, or pieces of timber to divide the large box into equal one foot by one foot squares. The ideal placement of the box is a spot that receives six to eight hours of sunlight per day and is away from any shading trees or shrubs. The box should be able to access from all sides. If this is impossible, make a narrower box, three by four, or a smaller box, three by three. Never walk in the plot – it will compact the soil and ruin the dynamics of the box.

How many seeds are to be placed in each square foot depends on the size of the plant. Small crops (such as radishes and carrots) can be planted 16 plants in each square with three inches in between them. For medium plants (spinach, large turnips, bush beans) nine plants per square foot with four inch spacing in required. Large plants, which need to be placed six inches apart (leaf lettuce and parsley, etc.) can be planted four to a square. Extra-large plants require a whole square for each plant; broccoli, cauliflower, cabbages, and peppers are all considered extra-large. Certain plants require more soil then six inches, such as root crops like carrots and potatoes and extra-long scallions and leeks, for these a one foot by one foot by six inch high box can be created and placed on top of an existing square. Vine crops such as cucumbers, tomatoes, squash, melons, and pumpkins need vertical support. A variety of items can be used for support such as electrical conduit, synthetic string, or nylon netting attached to metal supports, which will be attached to one side of the box. Make sure not to put the vertical support so it shades the rest of the plot. After harvesting add compost and replant the square with a different crop.

== Container or bucket gardening ==
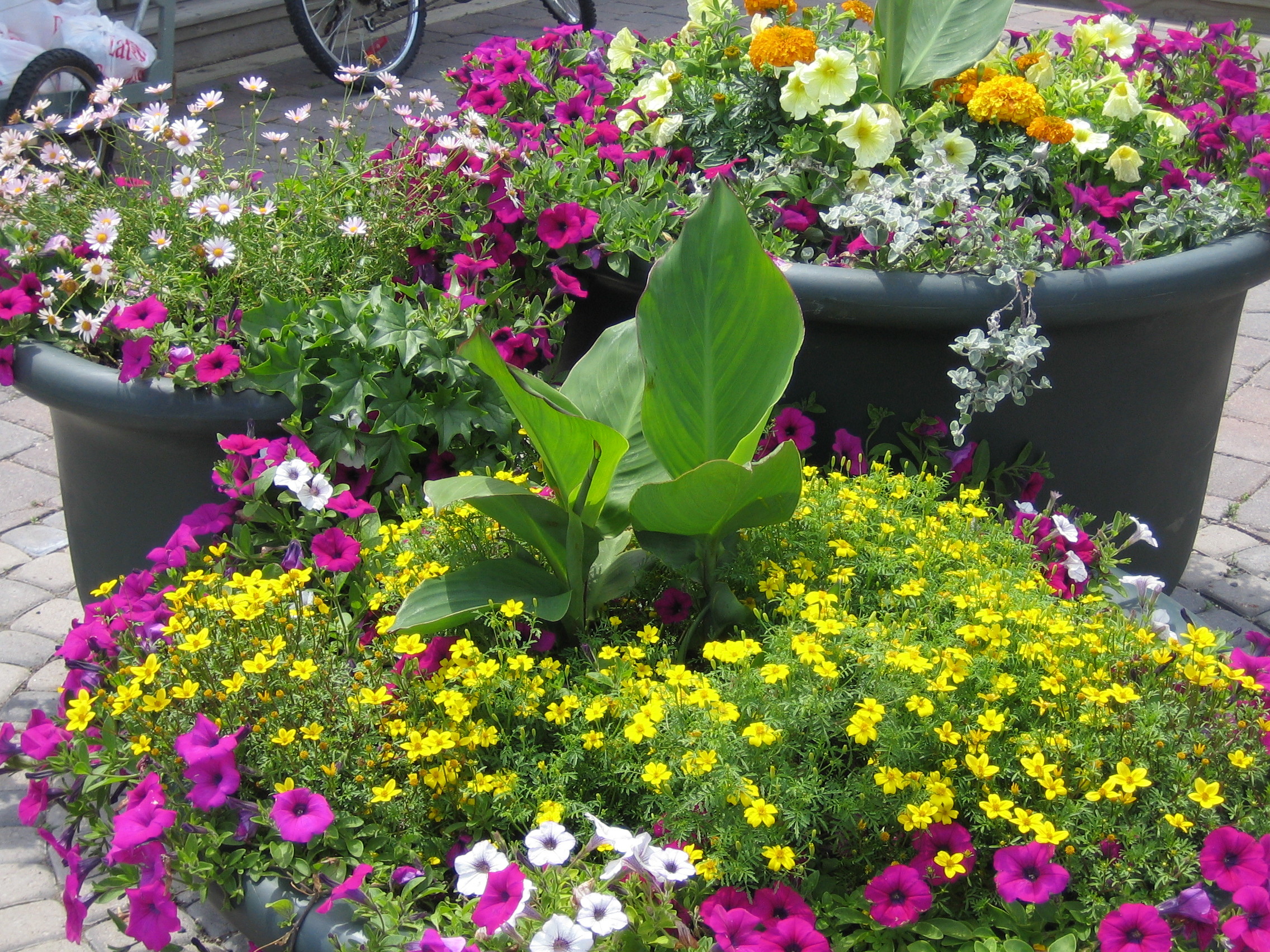
A container garden in large plastic planters

Container or bucket gardening involves growing plants in some type of container, whether it be commercially produced or an everyday object such as 5-gallon bucket, wooden crate, plastic storage container, kiddie pool, etc. Container gardening is convenient for those with limited spaces because the containers can be placed anywhere and as single items they take up very little room. There are also less weeds and less watering needs. It is inexpensive and people have personal control over the growth conditions.

To get started find a container and make sure it has a hole in the bottom for drainage. Be aware dark colors will get hotter and could harm the growing plants, porous containers will dry out faster than metal or plastic, and previous contents such as paint could be toxic to plants and people. Put the container where it will get western and southern exposure for the sunniest and warmest conditions or an eastern and northern exposure if shadier and cooler conditions are required. Warm season crops (squash, eggplant, tomato, pepper, etc.) need six to eight hours of direct sun and cool season crops (Asian greens, spinach, lettuce, etc.) need three to five hours. Fill the container with a growth medium, you want something light and porous. Commercial soil-less mixes tend to work very well. Coarse builder's sand is good because it is very porous and heavy, which helps weigh down containers. Also, compost is highly recommended. Some good media mixtures for container vegetables include: 100% compost, 100% soil-less mix, 25% garden soil + 75% compost, 25% soil-less mix + 25% garden soil + 50% compost, 25% garden soil + 75% soil-less mix, 50% soil-less mix + 50% compost (Recommended by the Maryland Cooperative Extension). If fertilizer is used, use a slow release version.

Just about any herb or vegetable can be grown in a container. Look for seed packages labeled dwarf, bush, or small if space is limited. The University of Maryland Cooperative Extension recommends media depth of four to six inches for things like leaf greens, Asian greens, mustards, garlic, radish, basil, cilantro, thyme, mint, and marjoram. Salad greens and some herbs have shallow, fibrous root systems and are well suited to shallow containers with a large surface area. Eight to twelve inch pots are ideal for beans, beets, chard, carrots, cabbage, pepper, eggplant, tomato, squash, rosemary, parsley, lavender, and fennel. Pot volume can also vary based on crop; one to three gallon containers are great for herbs, green onions, radishes, onion, chard, pepper, dwarf tomato, dwarf cucumber, and basil. A larger size of four to five gallon is recommended for full-size tomato, cucumber, eggplant, beans, peas, cabbage, and broccoli. Vines or climbing crops need supports, such as a trellis or piping, on back of the container. After harvesting the crops, add compost and plant a new variety of vegetable in the container to help spread nutrients.

== Tower gardening ==
Many gardeners face the problem of having limited space to cultivate their plants in. One solution is to garden up, instead of out. Tower gardening is a form of gardening which utilizes vertical space and therefore can be implemented in restricted spaces. Tower gardens are perfect for first time gardeners because they are easy to maintain. Overwatering is not as big of a problem with tower gardens and very little, to no tilling is needed. There is less kneeling involved and gardeners get less dirty managing a tower garden compared to traditional gardens.

The structure of a tower garden consists of several pots stacked on top of one another with a stabilizing rod placed through the center. The pots decrease in size as the tower grows taller. Start with a large pot for the base. Drill a hole in the bottom of each pot that is big enough for the support rod to fit through. Also, make holes for drainage in the bottom of each pot. Adequate drainage is essential to have a thriving tower garden. Fill the base pot with soil. Place a second pot on top of the base pot and fill it with soil. Continue to stack pots until the desired height is reached. It is recommended that the pots be stacked when they are being purchased to ensure that they are the right sizes. Use good potting soil that always has a good amount of drainage. For increased drainage, a mixture of garden soil, peat moss, and perlite works very well.

A wide variety of fruits, vegetables and herbs can be grown in a tower garden.

== Indoor gardening ==
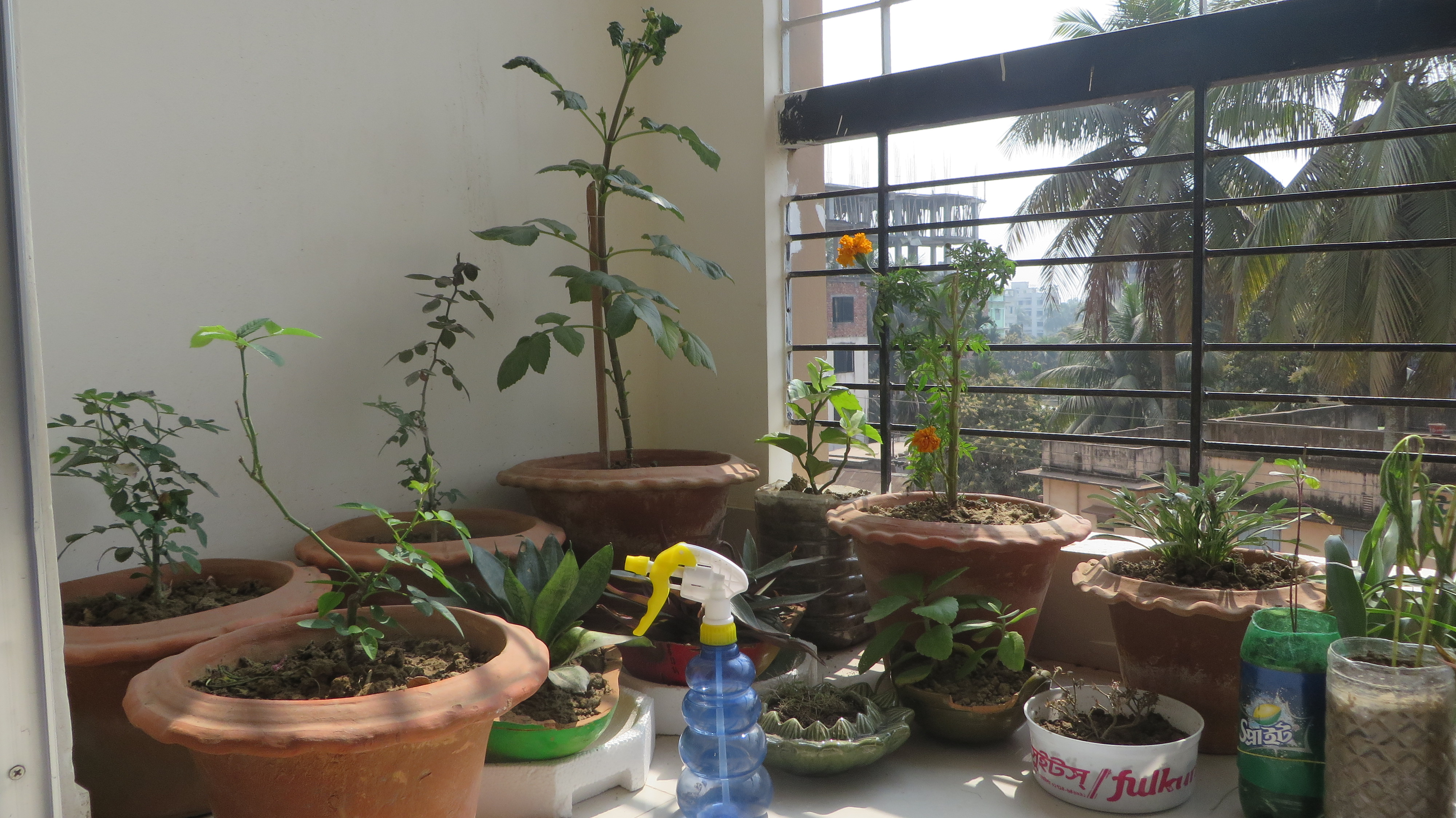
Gardening on a balcony

If someone loves gardening, but doesn't have the space to do it outdoors, indoor gardening may be the solution. An indoor vegetable, herb, or fruit garden is a way to grow healthy produce and have fresh food for cooking all year round.

When planning an indoor garden it is important to choose plants with light requirements that are conducive in homes. To maximize a plants sun exposure, place it in a room that receives high amounts of natural light. Artificial lights are an alternative if the natural lighting in a room is insufficient, and they can help plants reach their maximum growth potential. Indoor plants thrive on consistency. Stable temperatures (65–75 degrees Fahrenheit), consistent lighting, and regular watering are all beneficial for indoor plants.

Indoor plants can thrive in many areas in a variety of containers. Hanging plants are an excellent option if space is particularly scarce. When hanging plants it is important to make sure that the structure can support the weight of the plant when it is fully watered. Watering hanging plants can be done easily with a step stool and a long neck watering can. Plastic pots are one of the least expensive options but ceramic pots have shown to be a favorite among indoor gardeners. Whatever the container, is it important to make sure that there is adequate drainage. Water indoor plants with lukewarm water and be careful not to over water them. The soil should be fully hydrated, but not soaking. When choosing which plants to include in the garden, there are several factors which should be considered. The growing conditions of the plant should be consistent with the conditions where the plant will be kept. The amount of upkeep required by the plant is also important. Gardeners with little time may want to choose plants that don't require a lot of attention while more gardeners who plan on devoting more time to the garden should choose plants that are more meticulous. Finally, the amount of money devoted to the project should also be specified. Some plants require more financial support than others.

== Windowsill gardening ==
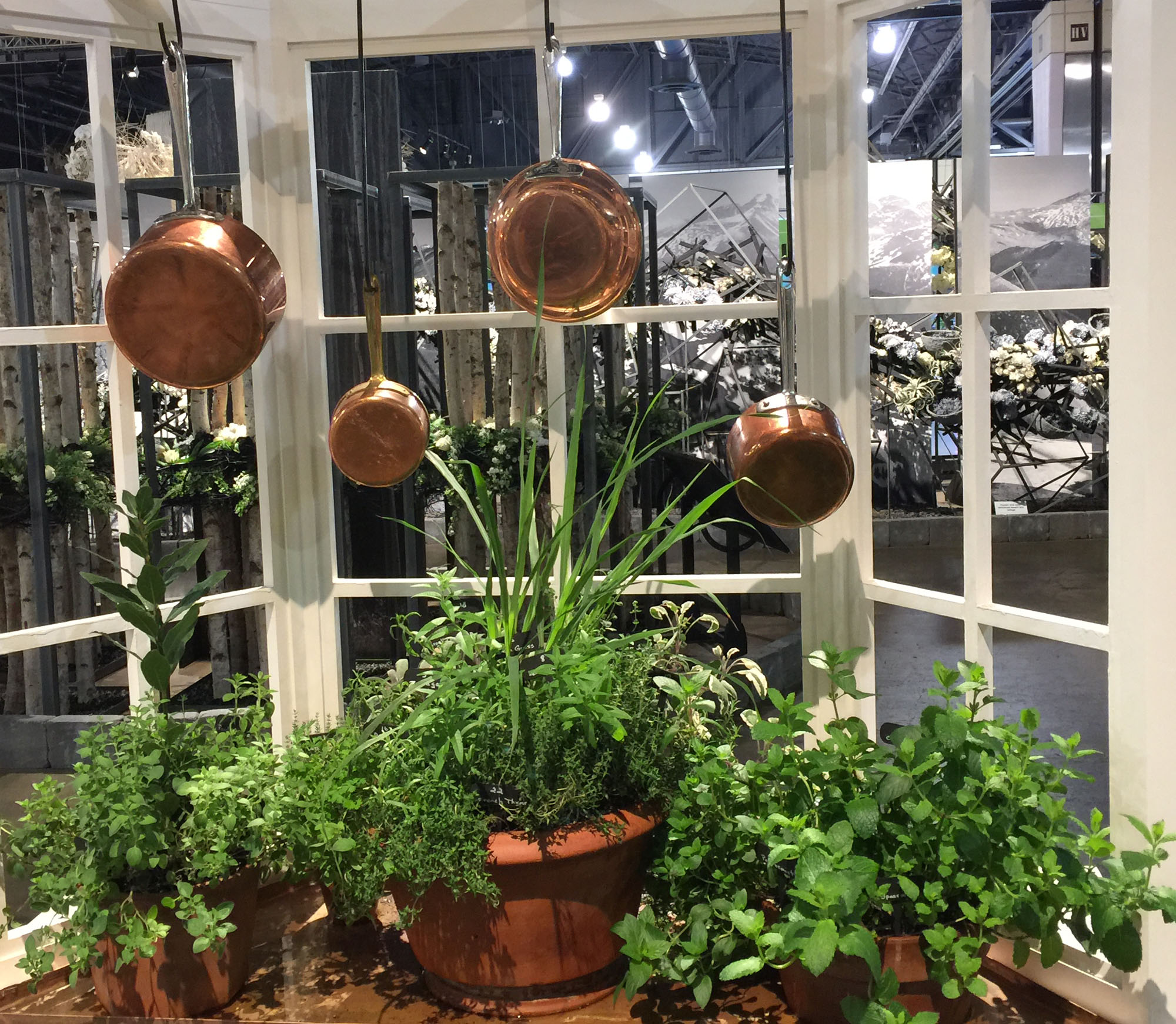
Windowsill garden

Gardening in windowsills may be the easiest way to have access to edible plants. Using the space of a windowsill to place a small potted plant can provide a new place for plants. The windowsill garden should be on a windowsill that gets at least six hours of sunlight a day. If edible food is being grown, it may be beneficial for to put the garden in or near the kitchen for easy access to food. Plants can be store-bought or grown from seeds or cuttings. Herbs, such as parsley, tarragon, basil, mint, thyme, oregano, or rosemary, are a perfect choice for windowsill gardening. Other foods that can be grown on windowsills include salad greens, wheatgrass, chick peas, beans, other sprouts, and cayenne peppers. The plants should be fertilized once a month or have a slow-release plant food system set up before they are planted. Herbs have more flavor if they are not overfed. The plants should also be turned about a quarter turn weekly to ensure that all sides of the plant are receiving an equal amount of sunlight.

A windowsill box can also be purchased to be placed inside or outside on windowsills. Plants can be kept in the pots they were purchased in, which allows them to be rearranged and replaced easily, or can be placed in soil and fertilizer in the box along with unpotted plants. Windowsill boxes allow for organization for the small space of the windowsill. Another alternative that provides more space is to purchase a greenhouse window or garden window. These windows go over or replace the existing window and provide extra space, including shelving, for plants. The specialty windows provide all of the same benefits of a greenhouse without needing the land space. Greenhouse windows can be purchased online in a variety of shapes, sizes, materials, and designs. These windows provide more space and sunlight for plants than regular windowsills.
