= Roof garden =

Planted area on the top covering of a building

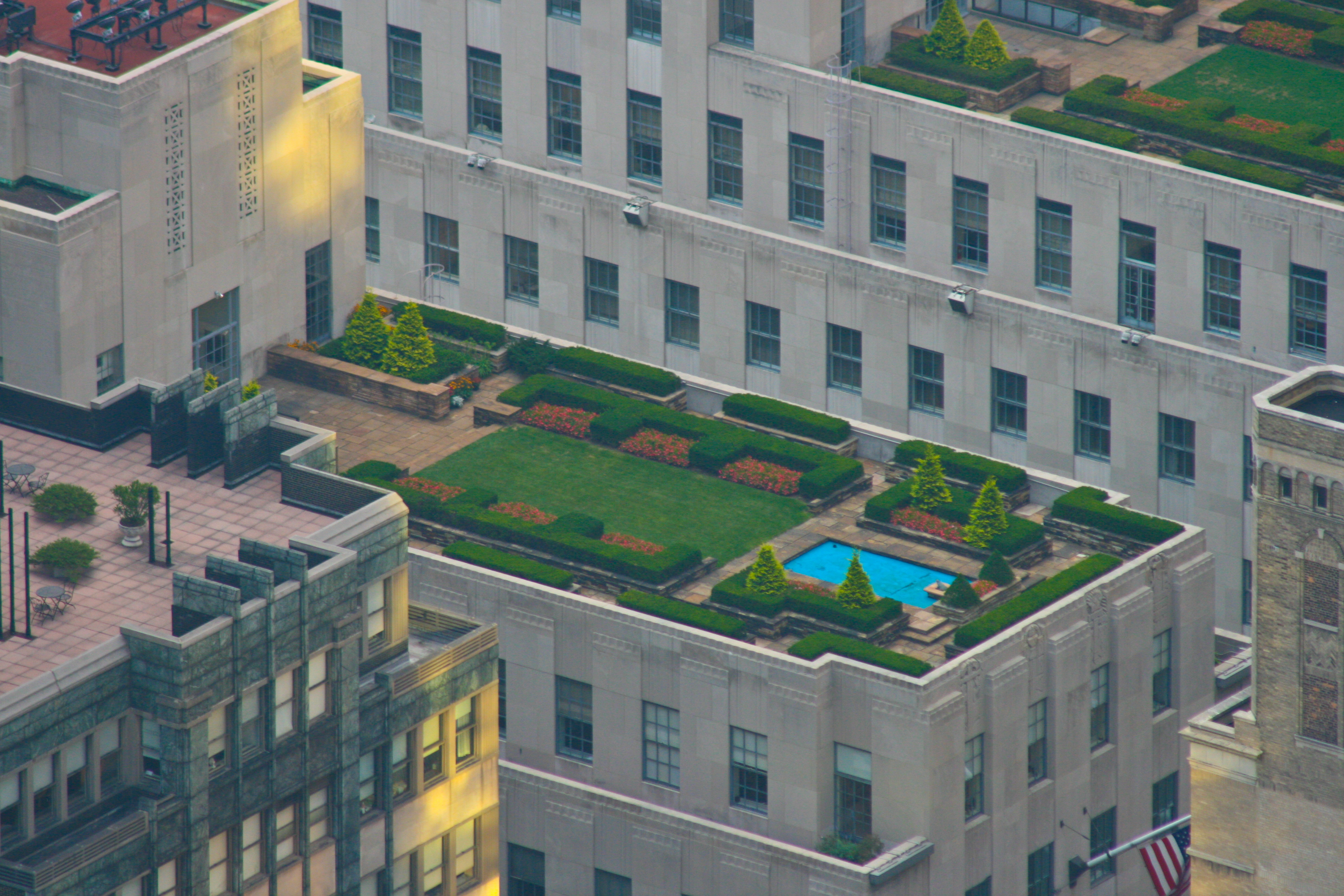
Roof garden of Rockefeller Center in Manhattan

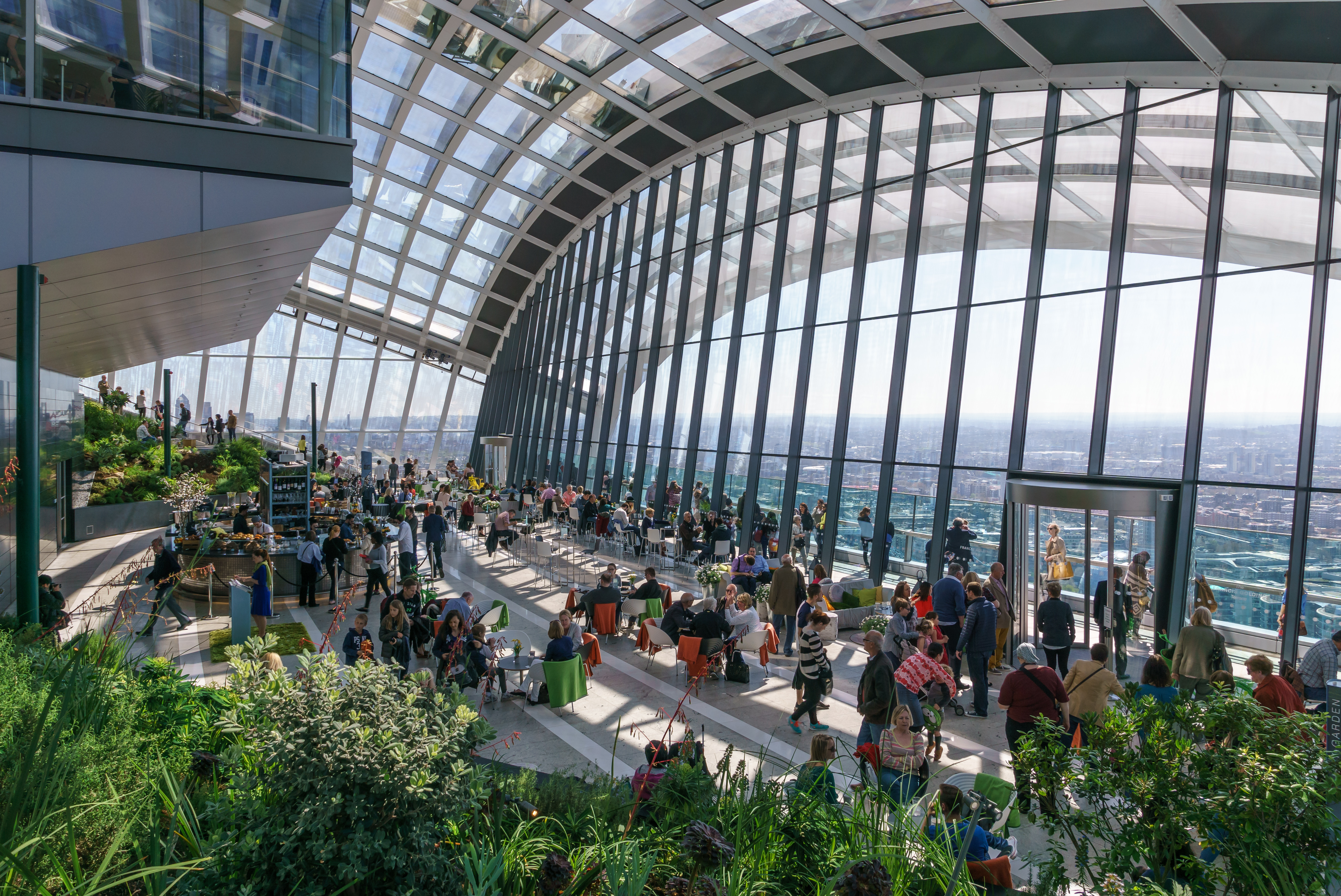
Sky garden at 20 Fenchurch Street in the historic City of London financial district

A roof garden is a garden on the roof of a building. Besides the decorative benefit, roof plantings may provide food, temperature control, hydrological benefits, architectural enhancement, habitats or corridors for wildlife, recreational opportunities, and in large scale it may even have ecological benefits. Though there are a variety of benefits that could come from a roof garden, net benefits depend on design and management. The practice of cultivating food on the rooftop of buildings is sometimes referred to as rooftop farming. Rooftop farming is usually done using green roof, hydroponics, aeroponics or air-dynaponics systems or container gardens.

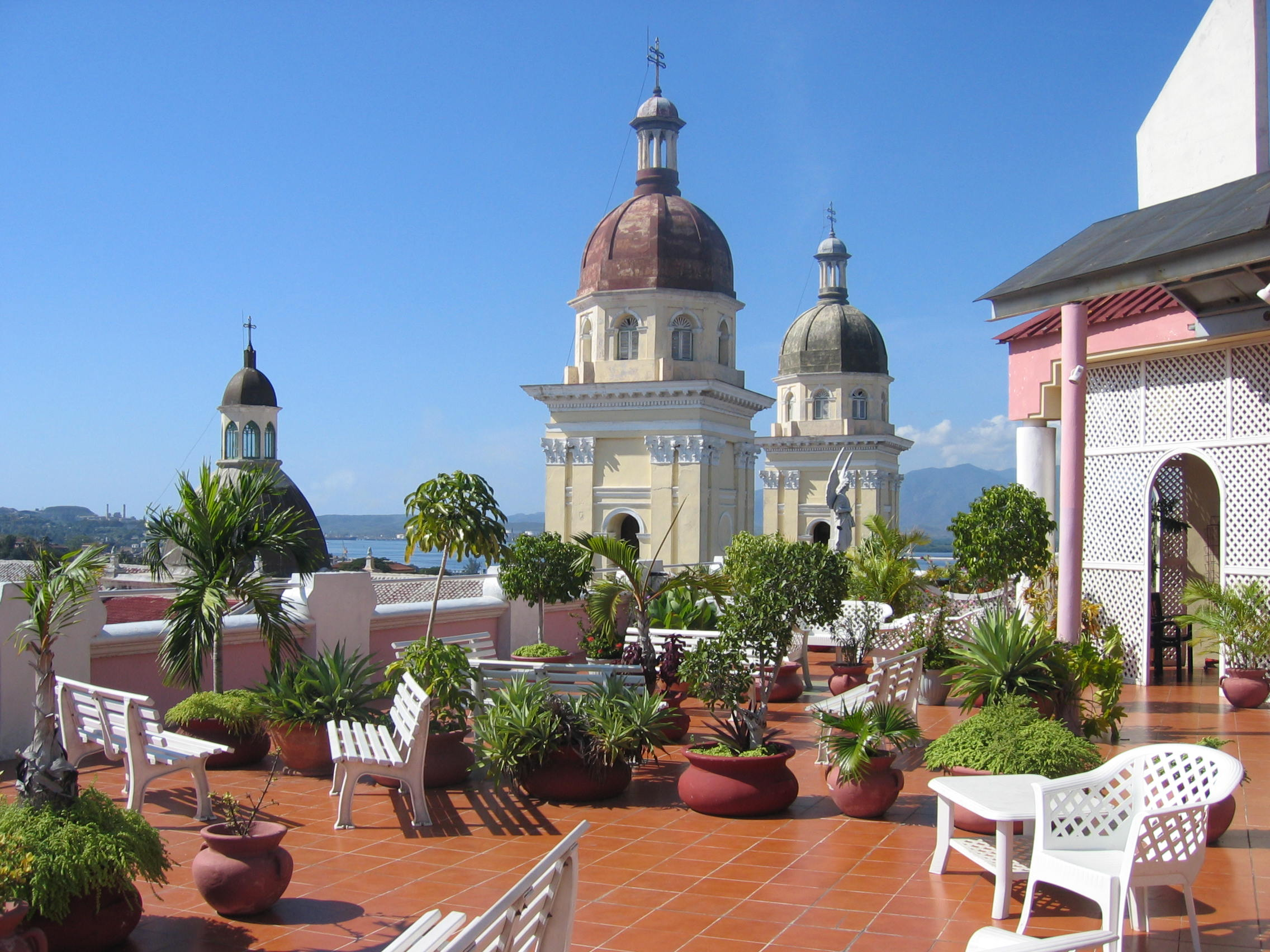
The roof terrace of the Casa Grande hotel in Santiago de Cuba.

== History ==
Humans have grown plants atop structures since the ziggurats of ancient Mesopotamia (4th millennium BC–600 BC) had plantings of trees and shrubs on aboveground terraces. An example in Roman times was the Villa of the Mysteries in Pompeii, which had an elevated terrace where plants were grown. A roof garden has also been discovered around an audience hall in Roman-Byzantine Caesarea. The medieval Egyptian city of Fustat had a number of high-rise buildings that Nasir Khusraw in the early 11th century described as rising up to 14 stories, with roof gardens on the top story complete with ox-drawn water wheels for irrigating them.

Among the Seven Wonders of the Ancient World, The Hanging Gardens of Babylon are often depicted as tall structures holding vegetation; even immense trees.

In New York City between 1880 and Prohibition large rooftop gardens built included the Hotel Astor (New York City), the American Theater on Eighth Avenue, the garden atop Stanford White's 1890 Madison Square Garden, and the Paradise Roof Garden opened by Oscar Hammerstein I in 1900. New York City roof gardens were commercially successful entertainment venues for concerts, vaudeville, and ballroom dance until the 1920s.

Commercial greenhouses on rooftops have existed at least since 1969, when Terrestris rooftop nursery opened on 60th st. in New York City.

In the 2010s, large commercial hydroponic rooftop farms were started by Gotham Greens, Lufa Farms, and others.

== Environmental impact ==
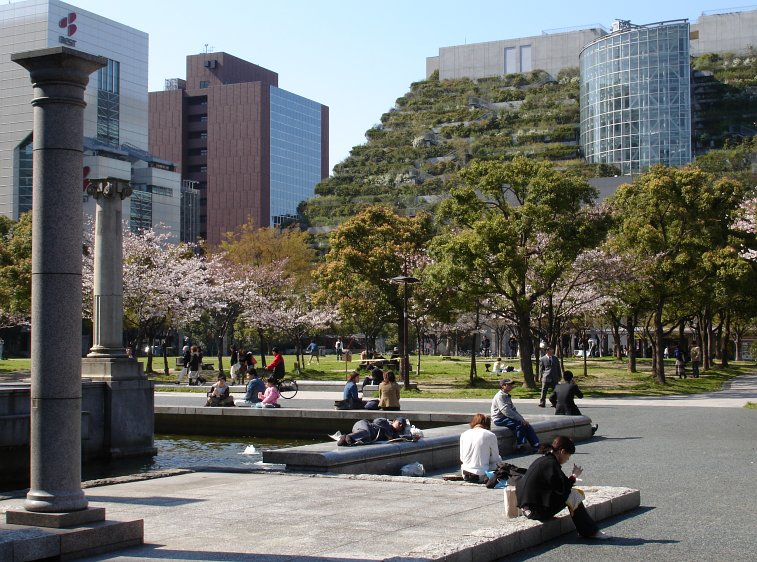
View of ACROS Fukuoka designed by architect Emilio Ambasz.

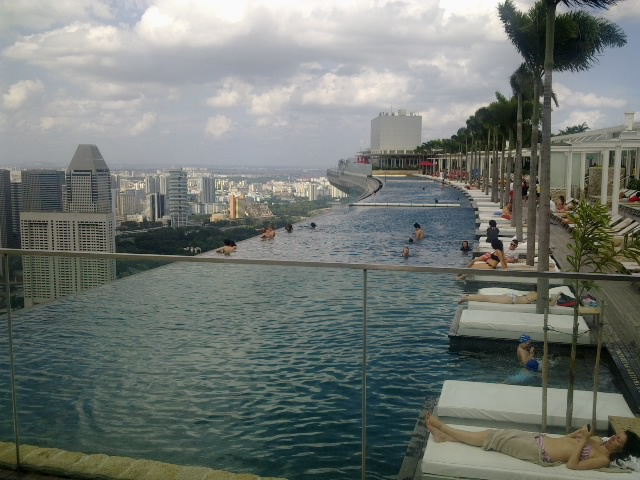
Infinity edge pool at Sands Sky Park, Marina Bay Sands Hotel, Singapore

Roof gardens are most often found in urban environments. Plants have the ability to reduce the overall heat absorption of the building which then reduces energy consumption for cooling. "The primary cause of heat build-up in cities is insolation, the absorption of solar radiation by roads and buildings in the city and the storage of this heat in the building material and its subsequent re-radiation. Plant surfaces however, as a result of transpiration, do not rise more than 4–5 °C (7–9 °F) above the ambient and are sometimes cooler." This then translates into a cooling of the environment between 3.6–11.3 °C (6.5–20.3 °F), depending on the area on earth (in hotter areas, the environmental temperature will cool more). The study was performed by the University of Cardiff.

A study at the National Research Council of Canada showed the differences between roofs with gardens and roofs without gardens against temperature. The study shows temperature effects on different layers of each roof at different times of the day. Roof gardens are obviously very beneficial in reducing the effects of temperature against roofs without gardens. "If widely adopted, rooftop gardens could reduce the urban heat island, which would decrease smog episodes, problems associated with heat stress and further lower energy consumption."

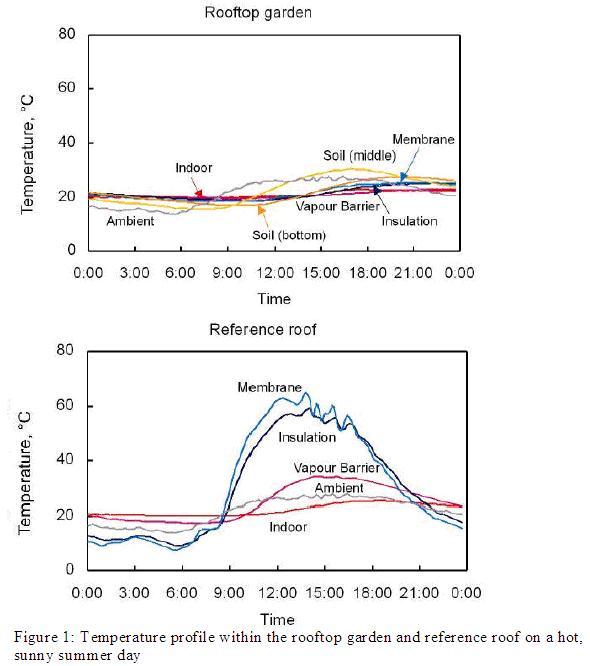

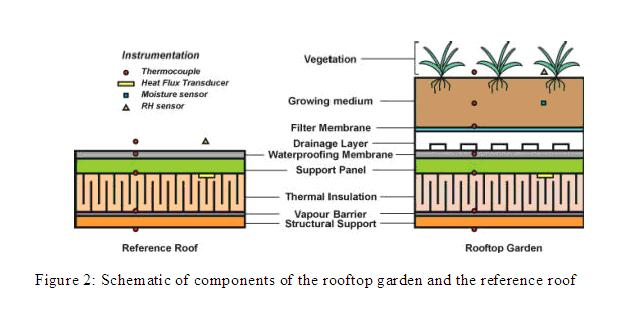

Aside from rooftop gardens providing resistance to thermal radiation, rooftop gardens are also beneficial in reducing rain run off. A roof garden can delay run off; reduce the rate and volume of run off. "As cities grow, permeable substrates are replaced by impervious structures such as buildings and paved roads. Storm water run-off and combined sewage overflow events are now major problems for many cities in North America. A key solution is to reduce peak flow by delaying (e.g., control flow drain on roofs) or retaining run-off (e.g., rain detention basins). Rooftop gardens can delay peak flow and retain the run-off for later use by the plants."

== Urban agriculture ==
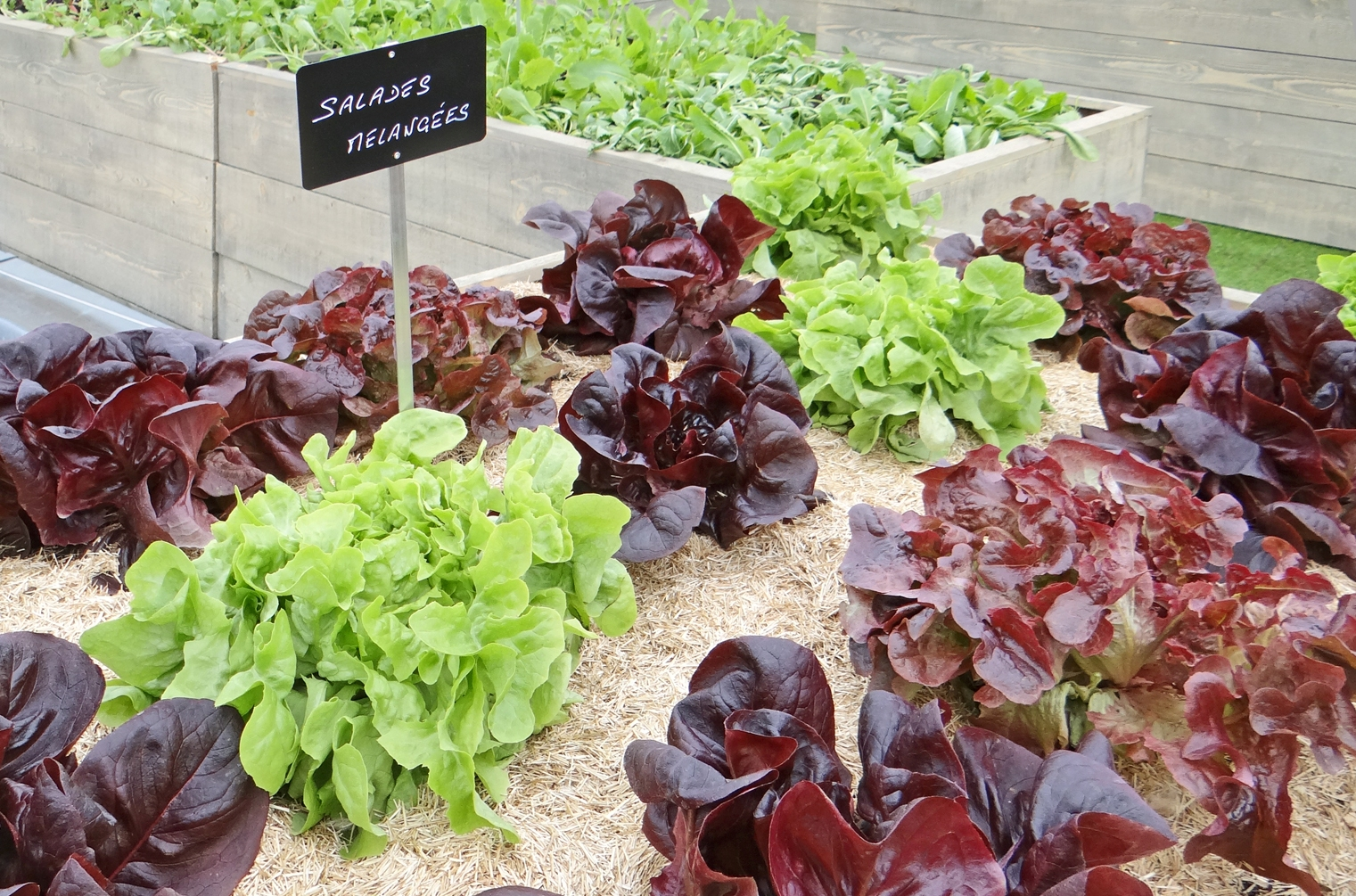
Palais de Tokyo, Paris

A rooftop farm in New York City

“In an accessible rooftop garden, space becomes available for localized small-scale urban agriculture, a source of local food production. An urban garden can supplement the diets of the community it feeds with fresh produce and provide a tangible tie to food production.” At Trent University, there is currently a working rooftop garden which provides food to the student café and local citizens.

Available gardening areas in cities are often seriously lacking, which is likely the key impetus for many roof gardens. The garden may be on the roof of an autonomous building which takes care of its own water and waste. Hydroponics and other alternative methods can expand the possibilities of roof top gardening by reducing, for example, the need for soil or its tremendous weight. Plantings in containers are used extensively in roof top gardens. Planting in containers prevents added stress to the roof's waterproofing. One high-profile example of a building with a roof garden is Chicago City Hall.

For those who live in small apartments with little space, square foot gardening, or (when even less space is available) green walls (vertical gardening) can be a solution. These use much less space than traditional gardening.

== Importance to urban planning ==
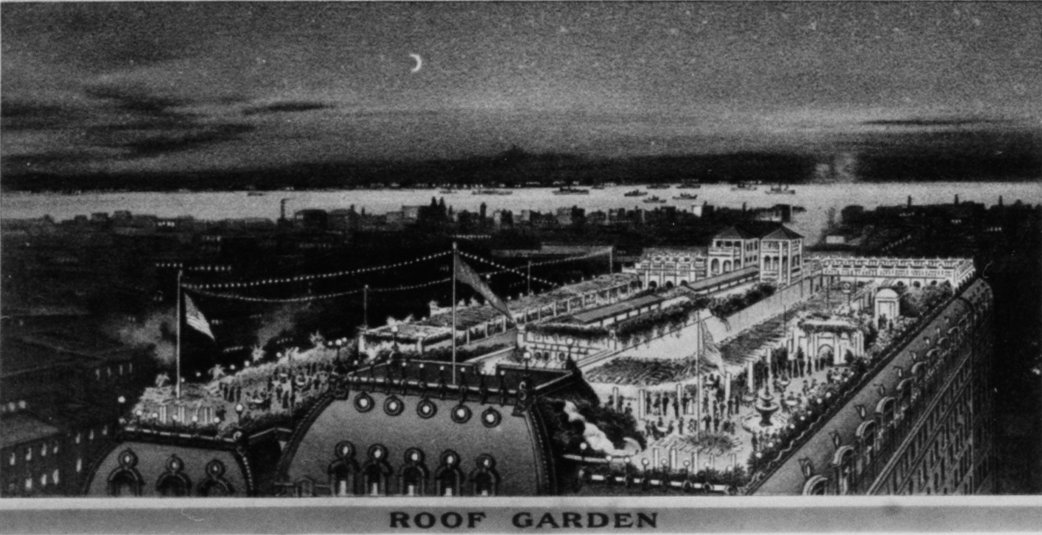
Hotel Astor roof garden, ca. 1904

Becoming green is a high priority for urban planners. The environmental and aesthetic benefits to cities are the prime motivation. It was calculated that the temperature in Tokyo could be lowered by 0.11–0.84 °C (0.20–1.51 °F) if 50% of all available rooftop space were planted with greenery. This would lead to savings of approximately 100 million yen.

Singapore is active in green urban development. "Roof gardens present possibilities for carrying the notions of nature and open space further in tall building development." When surveyed, 80% of Singapore residents voted for more roof gardens to be implemented in the city's plans. Recreational reasons, such as leisure and relaxation, beautifying the environment, and greenery and nature, received the most votes. Planting roof gardens on the tops of buildings is a way to make cities more efficient.

A roof garden can be distinguished from a green roof, although the two terms are often used interchangeably. The term roof garden is well suited to roof spaces that incorporate recreation, and entertaining and provide additional outdoor living space for the building's residents. It may include planters, plants, dining and lounging furniture, outdoor structures such as pergolas and sheds, and automated irrigation and lighting systems.

Although they may provide aesthetic and recreational benefits a green roof is not necessarily designed for this purpose. A green roof may not provide any recreational space and be constructed with an emphasis on improving the insulation or improving the overall energy efficiency and reducing the cooling and heating costs within a building.

Green roofs may be extensive or intensive. The terms are used to describe the type of planting required. The panels that comprise a green roof are generally no more than a few centimeters up to 30 cm (a few inches up to a foot) in depth, since weight is an important factor when covering an entire roof surface. The plants that go into a green roof are usually sedum or other shallow-rooted plants that will tolerate the hot, dry, windy conditions that prevail in most rooftop gardens. With a green roof, "the plants' layer can shield off as much as 87% of solar radiation while a bare roof receives 100% direct exposure".

The planters on a roof garden may be designed for a variety of functions and vary greatly in depth to satisfy aesthetic and recreational purposes. These planters can hold a range of ornamental plants: anything from trees, shrubs, vines, or an assortment of flowers. As aesthetics and recreation are the priority they may not provide the environmental and energy benefits of a green roof.

== In popular culture ==
- American jazz singer Al Jarreau composed a song named "Roof Garden", released on his 1981 album.
- Apu Nahasapeemapetilon of the TV show The Simpsons has a rooftop garden visited by Paul McCartney and his wife.
- In BBC's 1990 television miniseries House of Cards, the main character, Member of Parliament (MP) Francis Urquhart, murders journalist Mattie Storin by throwing her off the Palace of Westminster's rooftop garden.

== Gallery ==
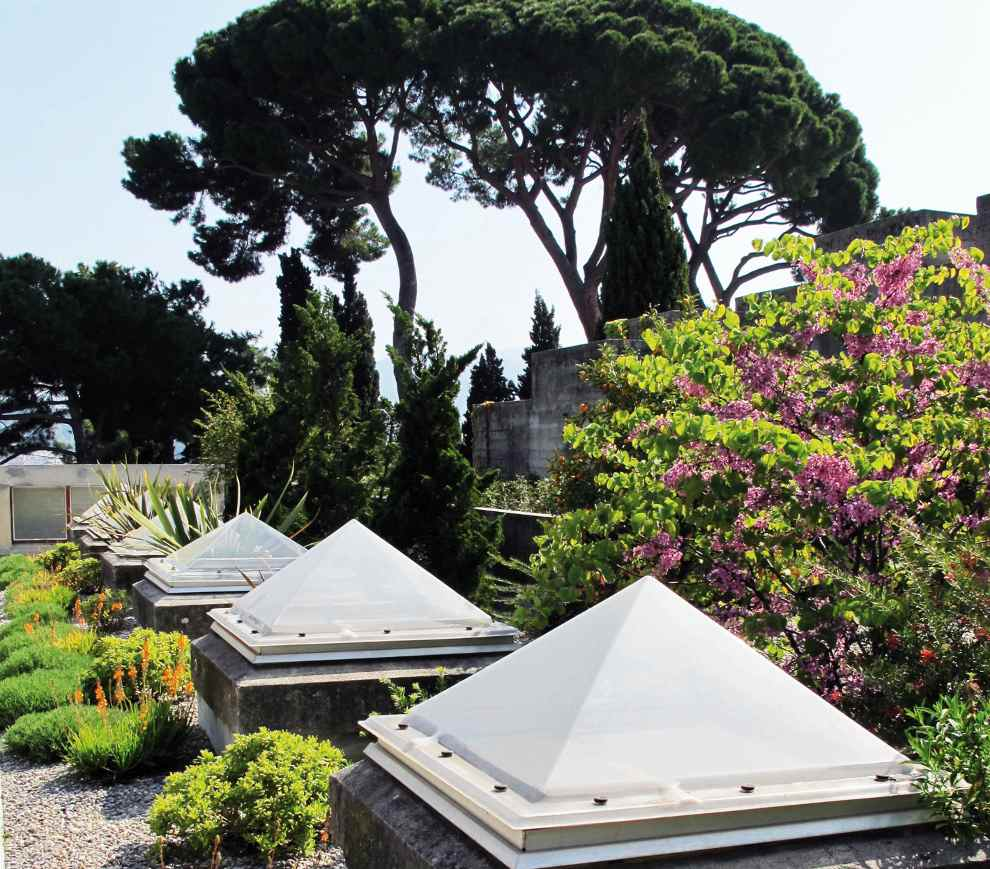
Villa Arson

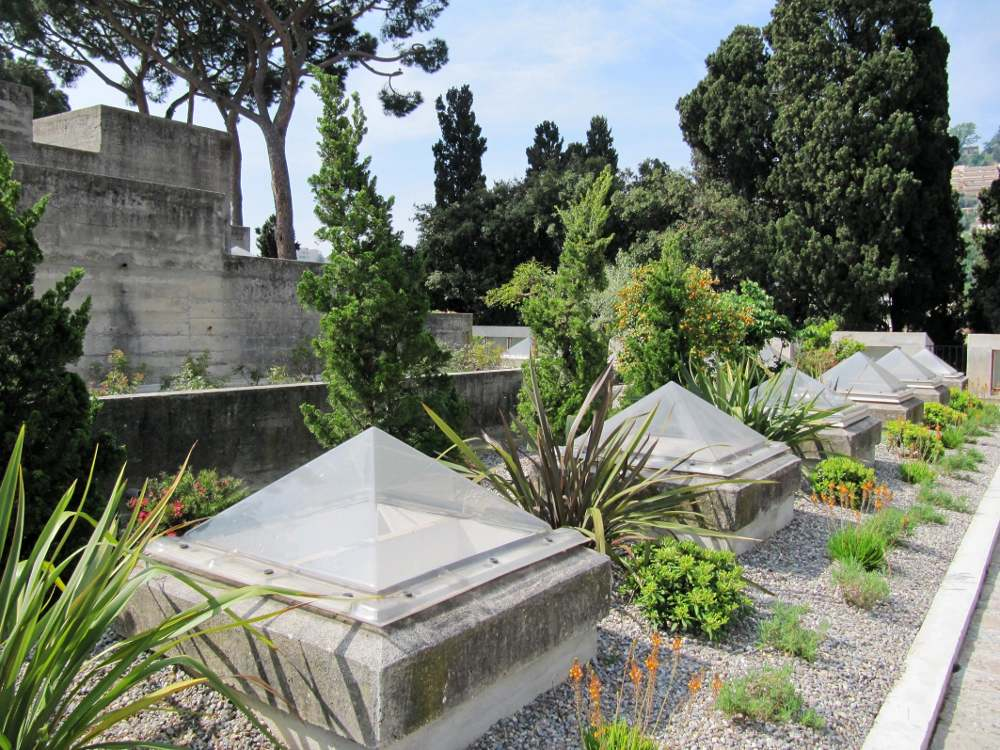
Villa Arson

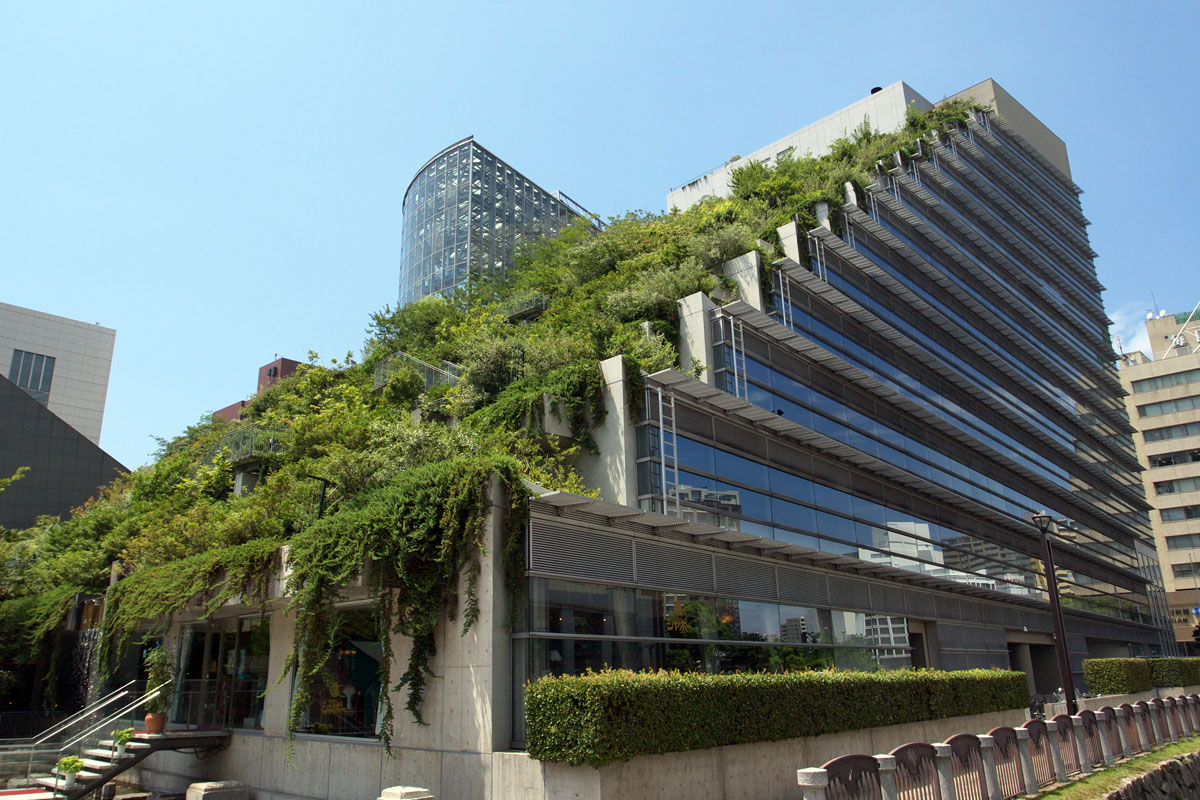
ACROS Fukuoka

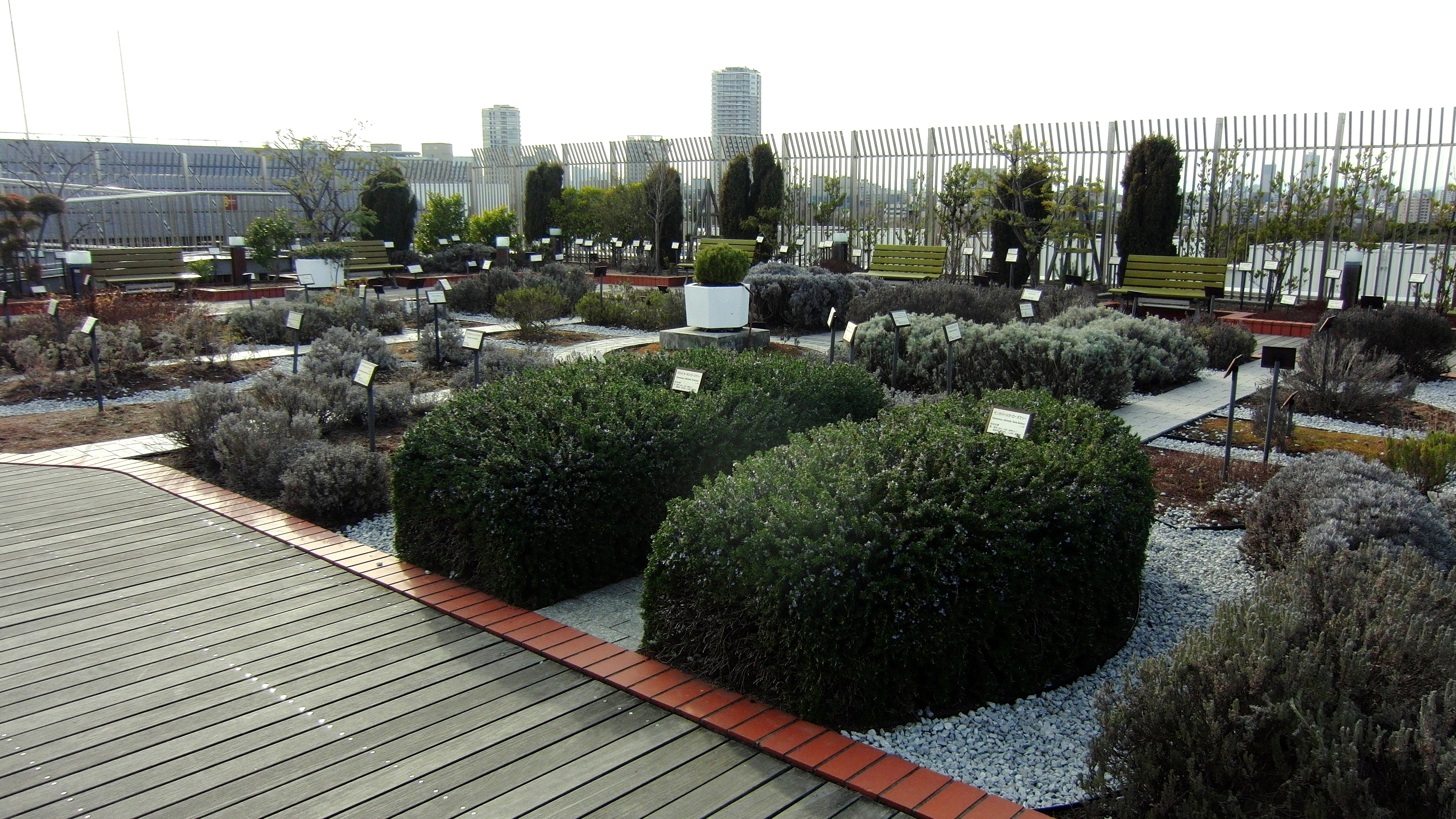
Herb garden of National Museum of Nature and Science Tokyo

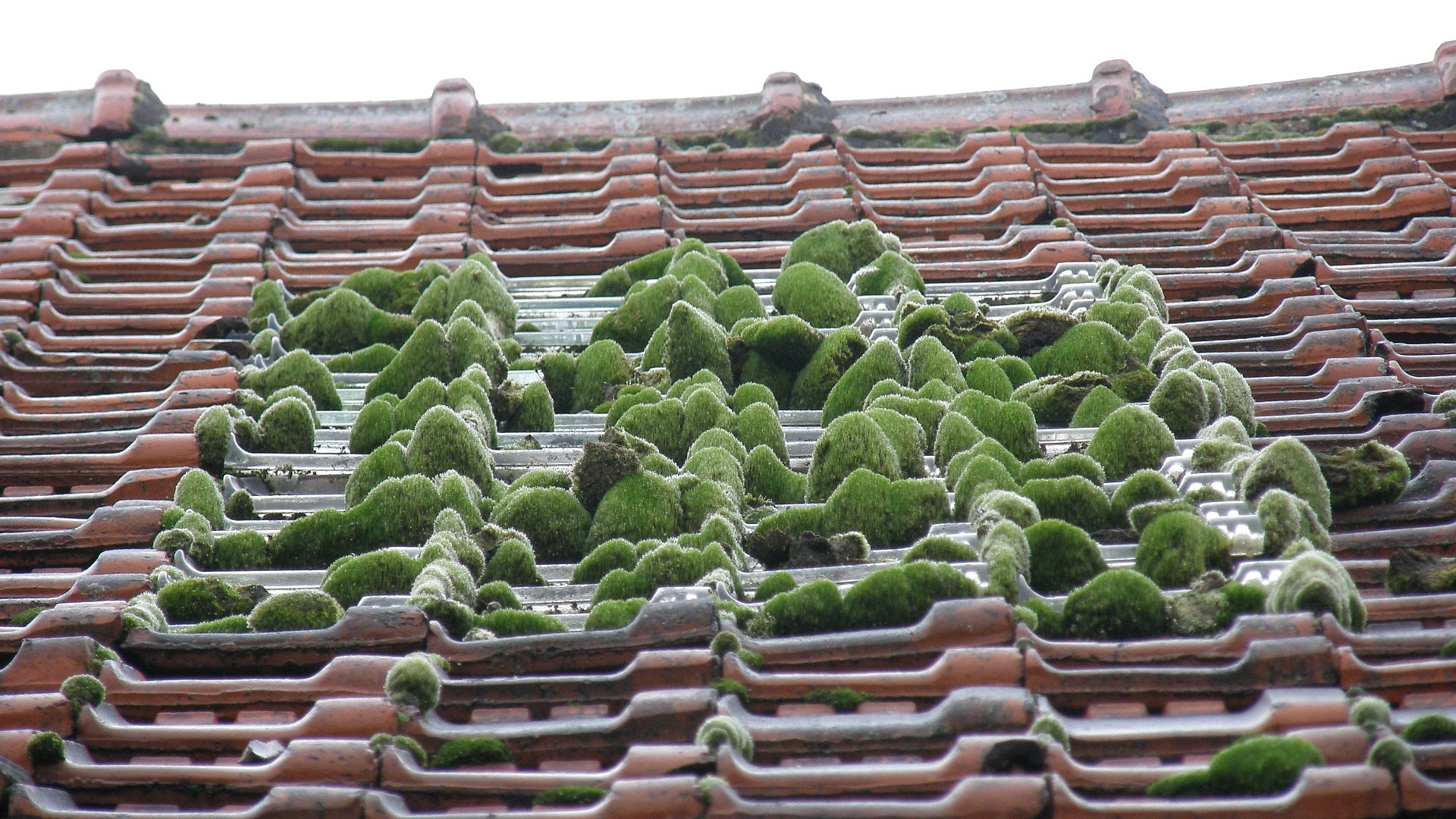
A small Zen roof garden

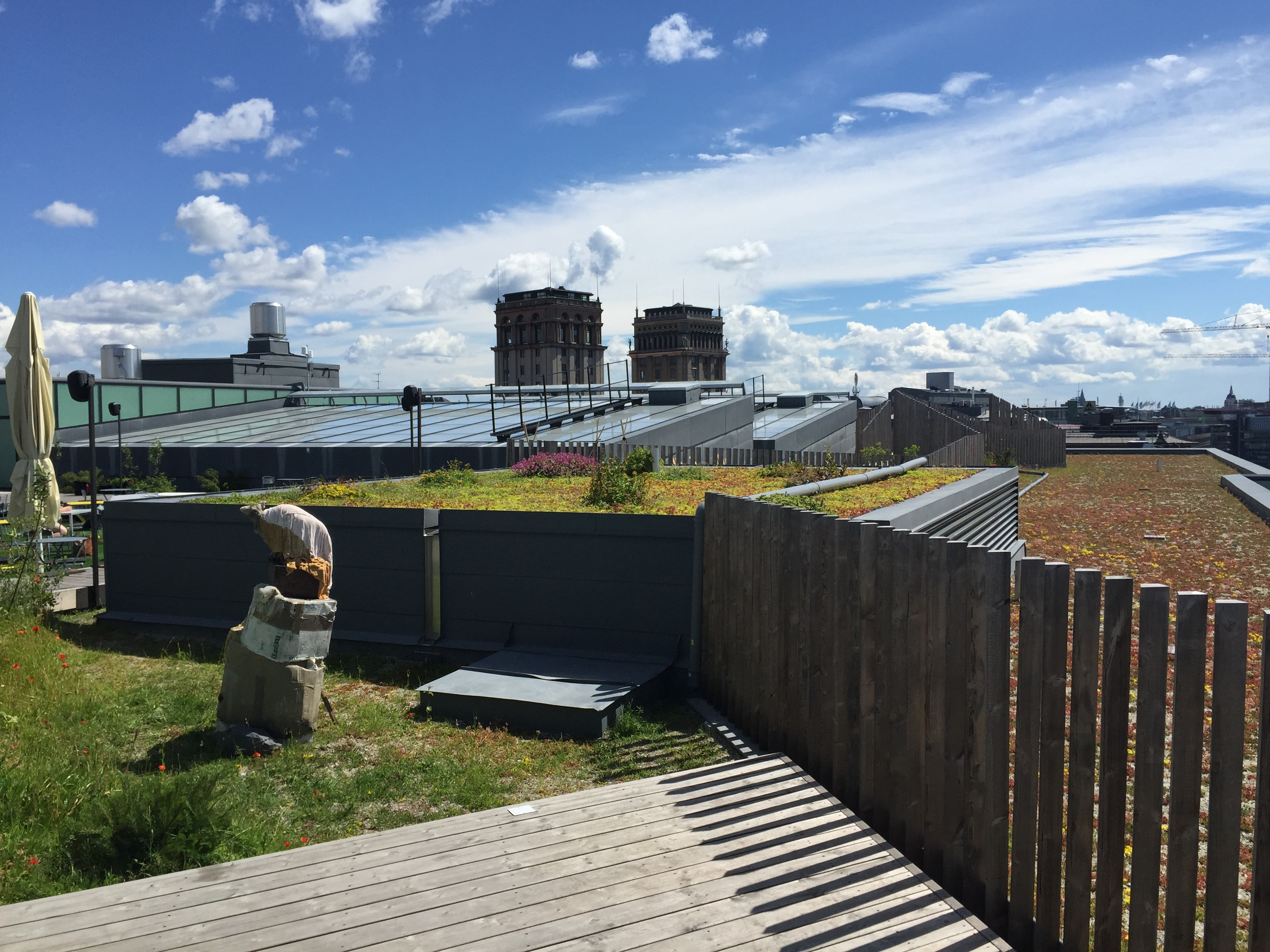
Sedum roof at Urban Deli, Stockholm

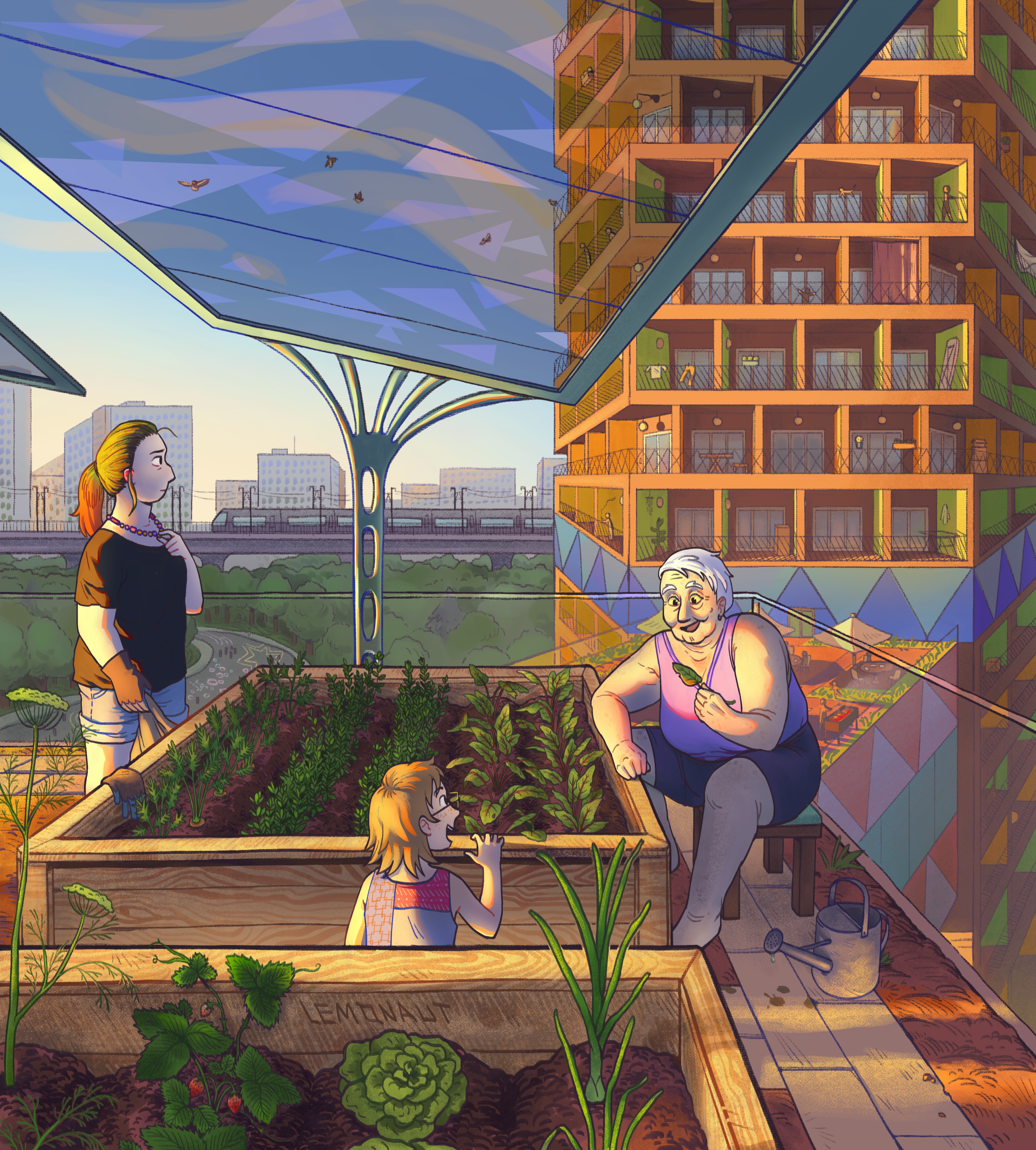
Rooftop community gardens are a common theme in solarpunk art

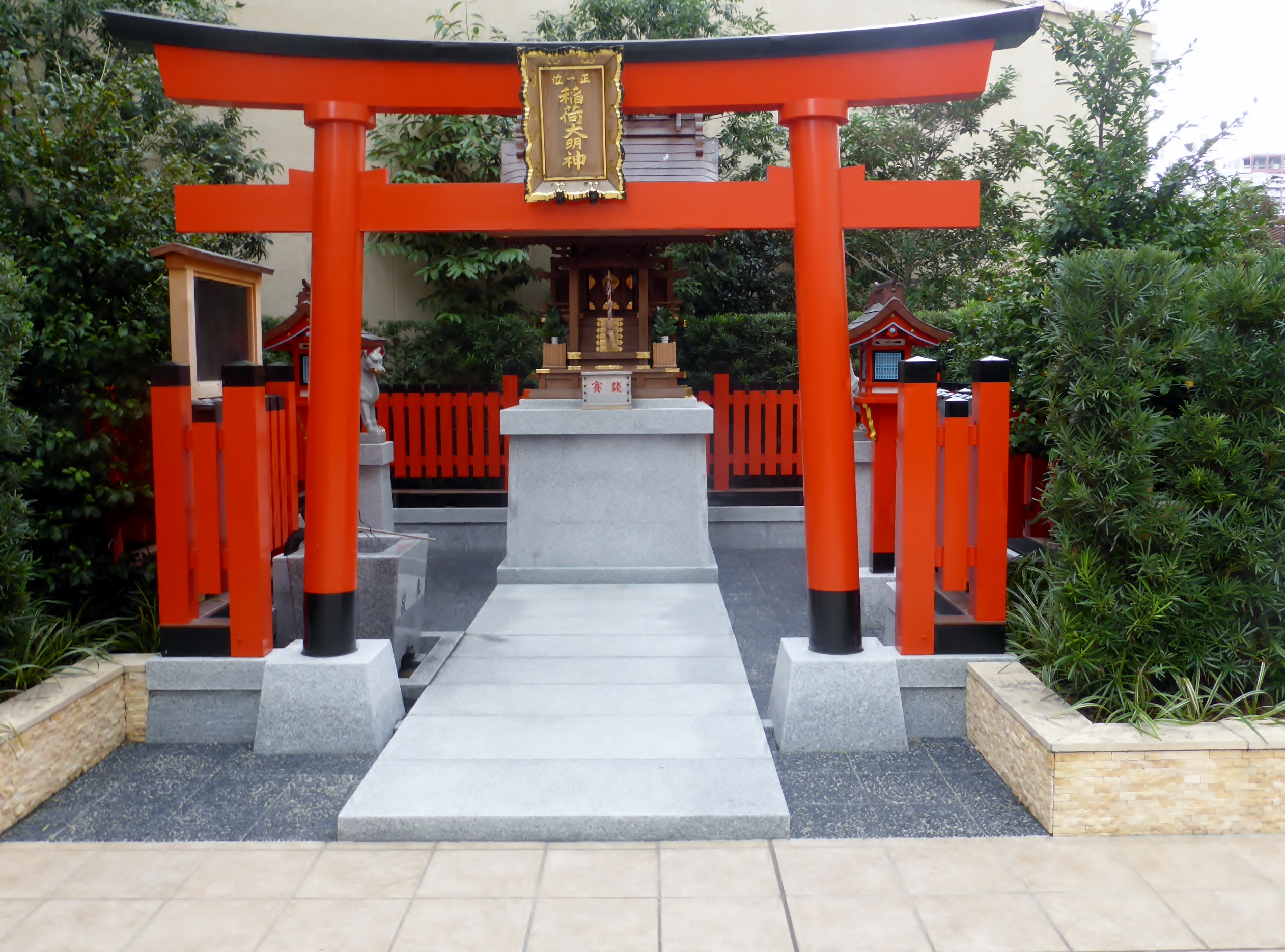
Inari Daimyojin on the roof of Hankyu Department Stores Umeda main store

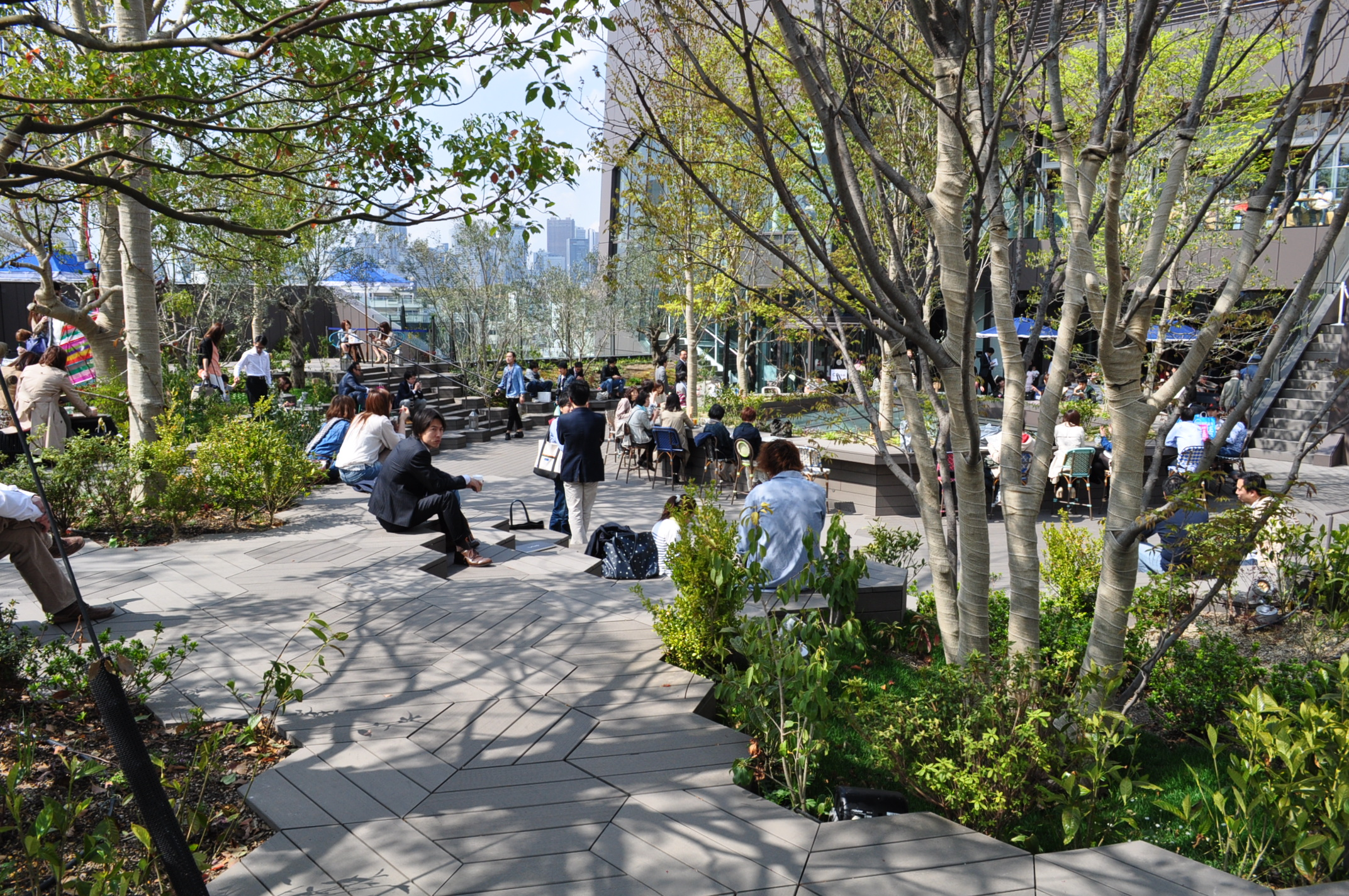
Tokyo Plaza

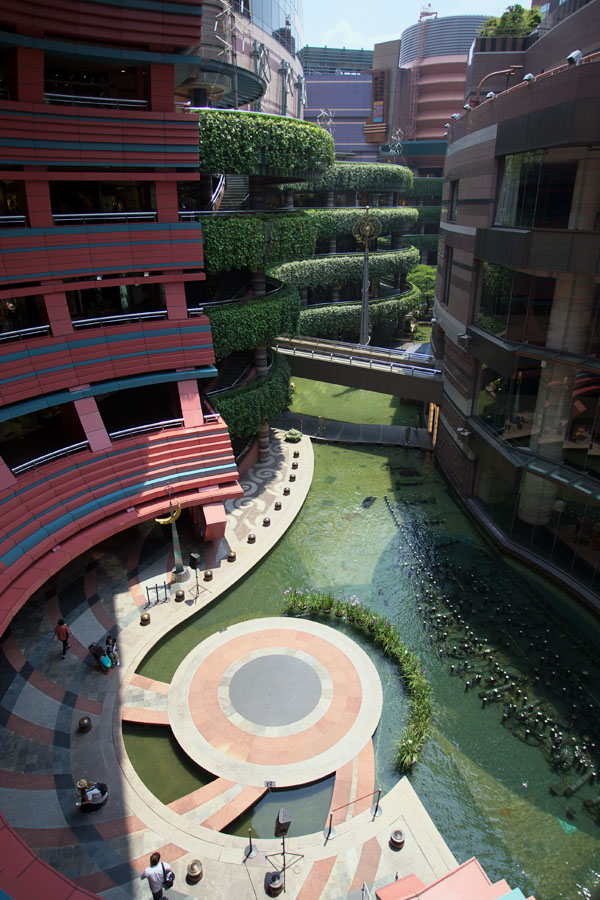
Canal City Hakata

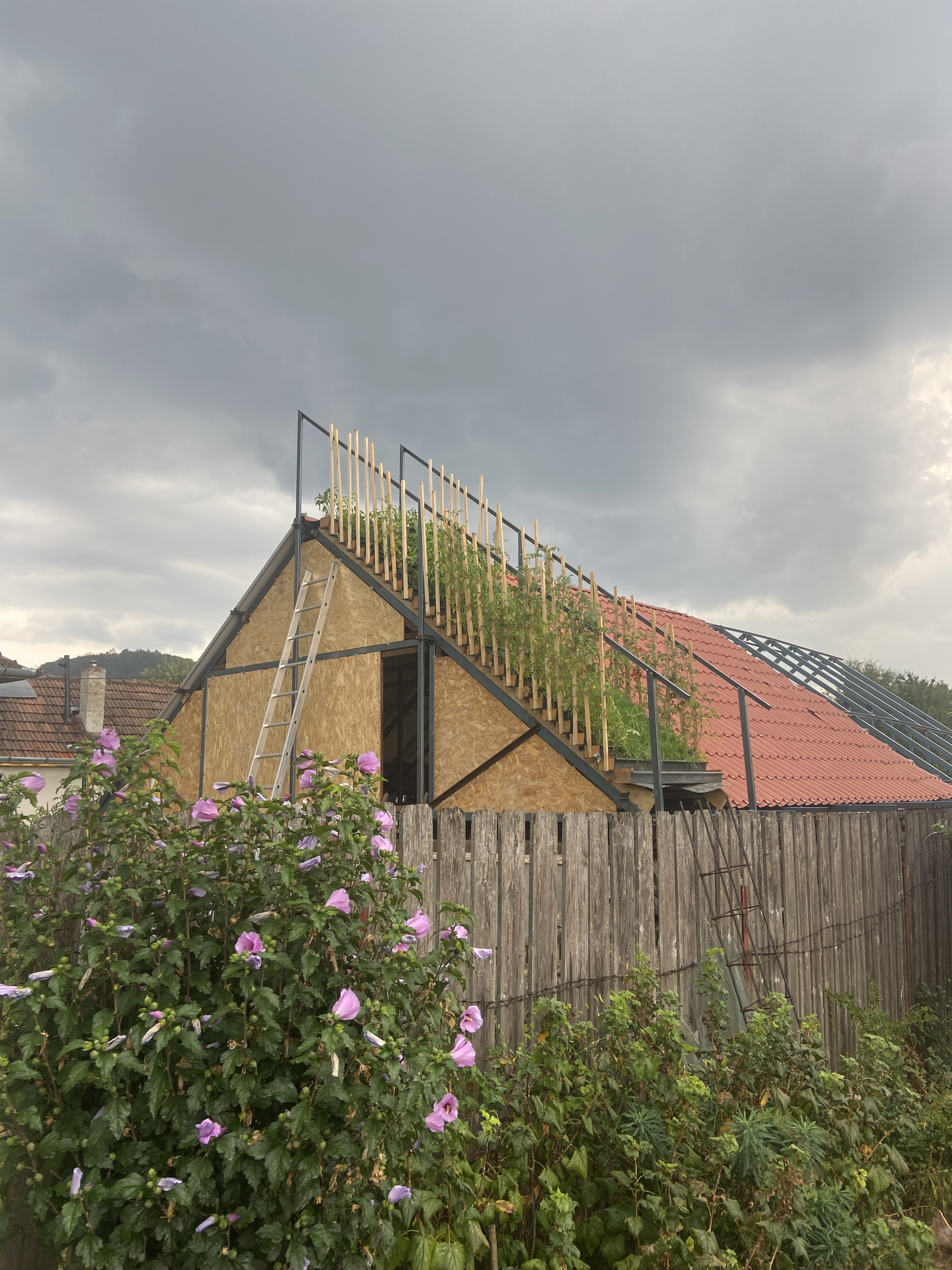
F-Roof: a multi-function (food and energy production), single-layer (no tiles behind) roof in Cugir, Romania.

== See also ==
- Agrivoltaic
- Building-integrated agriculture
- Cool roof
- Green building
- Green infrastructure
- Greening
- Kensington Roof Gardens
- List of garden types
- Low-flow irrigation systems
- Metropolitan Museum of Art Roof Garden
- Ralph Hancock, designer of The Rockefeller Center Roof Gardens
- Roof deck
- Sod roof
- Terrace garden
- Urban ecology
- Urban green space
- Urban park
- Urban wildlife
- Wildlife corridor
