= Mel Bartholomew =

American gardener and writer (1931-2016)

Mel Bartholomew (December 14, 1931 – April 28, 2016) was an American gardener, engineer, inventor, businessman, television presenter, and writer. He is known for originating the method of square foot gardening.

== Early life and education ==
Bartholomew was born in Kingston, New York, on December 14, 1931, to Earl Bartholomew and Alethe Trageser. His father was an executive in a linen company. He was raised in San Gabriel, California.

In 1953, Bartholomew graduated from the Georgia Institute of Technology with a BA in civil engineering. He then served as a first lieutenant in the United States Army, where he was stationed in Maryland, Texas and Germany.

== Career ==
After leaving the army, Bartholomew founded an engineering construction firm which was headquartered in Maplewood, New Jersey. The firm worked on the construction of Stony Brook University on Long Island, which led Bartholomew to settle near there in Old Field when he retired in 1975.

=== Square Foot Gardening ===
A basic, 4x4, 16-unit "square-foot garden"

In 1974, Bartholomew became involved in the Environmental Center in Smithtown, New York, where he started the first community garden at the Hawkins Barn. The garden was initially successful, but the community lost interest and the garden plots became overgrown. Bartholomew understood the problem as one of garden design, saying that he started to seek "an easy, fool-proof, continual-garden method that would work in small spaces and require less work, with a high yield."

In 1976, after two years of research and practice, he found that a densely packed, 12-foot-by-12-foot subdivided "square foot garden" to be the more efficient and successful method compared to traditional backyard gardening. The method was based upon a "raised, open-bottom bed with a lumber frame. The garden was made up of nine 4-foot-by-4-foot squares, each subdivided into 16 separate square-foot plots and planted with a different crop." He adapted commercial techniques, removing the labor intensive aspects to suit an amateur backyard enthusiast. Bartholomew said about his new efficient, time-saving method that "I garden with a salad bowl in mind, not a wheelbarrow."

In 1981, he published his first book Square Foot Gardening through Rodale Press. The book was one of the most successful gardening books in American history. It sold nearly a million copies and as of 1996 was still one of the top 10 best selling gardening books in the United States.

In 1982 he started a PBS program called Square Foot Gardening, which began after he had a one-minute evening news spot on a local television channel. The program was broadcast nationally for six years, giving him and his method a national profile. He traveled around the country demonstrating the design and planting of square foot gardens. The method was widely popular, with Bartholomew receiving 1,000 fan letters in one day in the mid-1980s. The state of Louisiana adopted it as the official garden practice taught in its schools.

The Mel Bartholomew Foundation Ltd was established in April 1996 and currently exists as the Square Foot Gardening Foundation. https://squarefootgardening.org/

== Personal life ==
Bartholomew died in San Diego, California, from liver cancer on April 28, 2016, aged 84.
