= Watering can =

Container used for watering plants

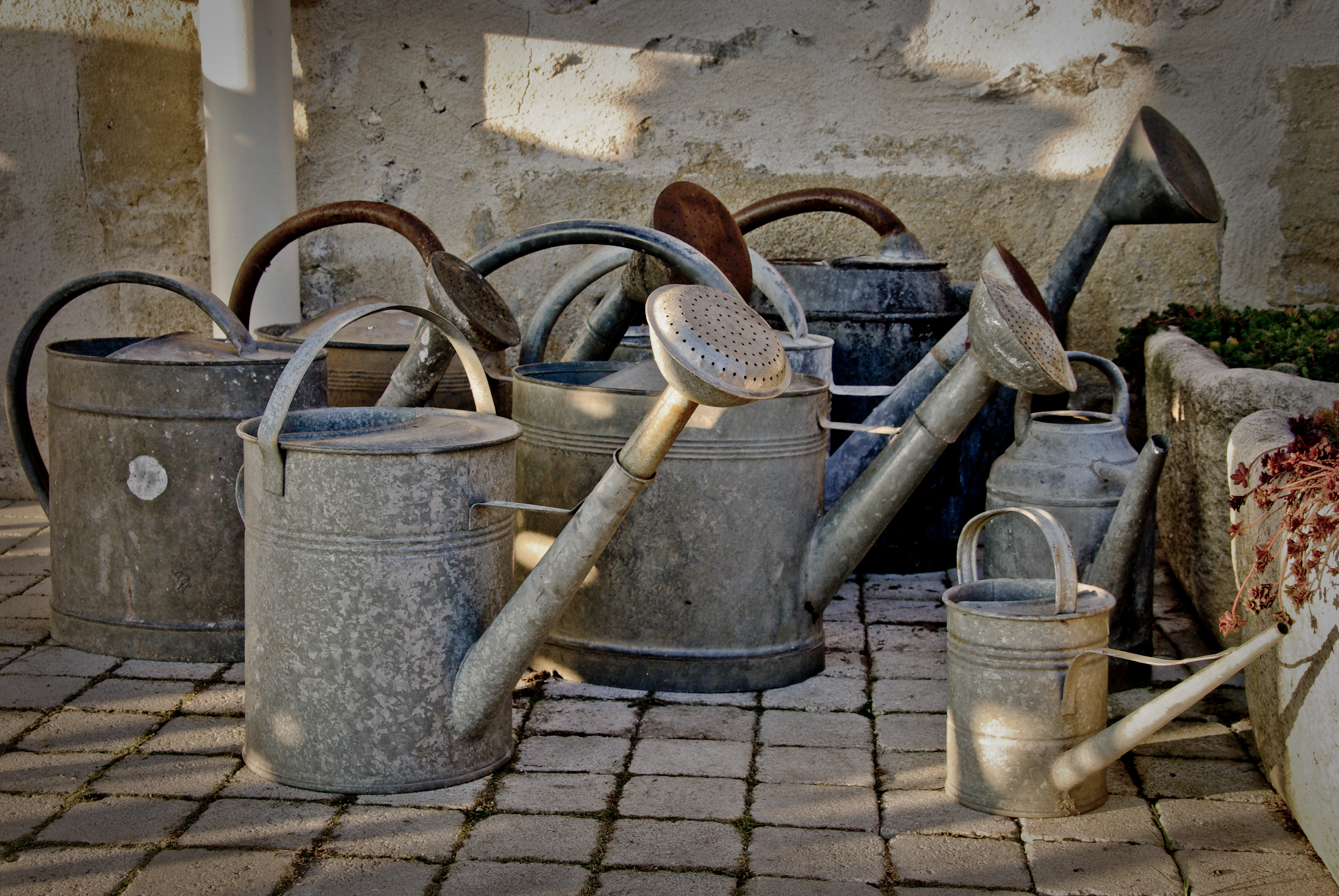
Assorted watering cans made of metal

A watering can (or watering pot or watering jug) is a portable container, usually with a handle and a funnel, used to water plants by hand. It has been in use since at least A.D. 79 and has since seen many improvements in design. Apart from watering plants, it has varied uses, as it is a fairly versatile tool.

The capacity of the container can be anywhere from 0.5 litres (for indoor household plants) to 10 litres (for general garden use). It is usually made of metal, ceramic or plastic. At the end of the spout, a "rose" (a device, like a cap, with small holes) can be placed to break up the stream of water into droplets, to avoid excessive water pressure on the soil or on certain delicate plants.

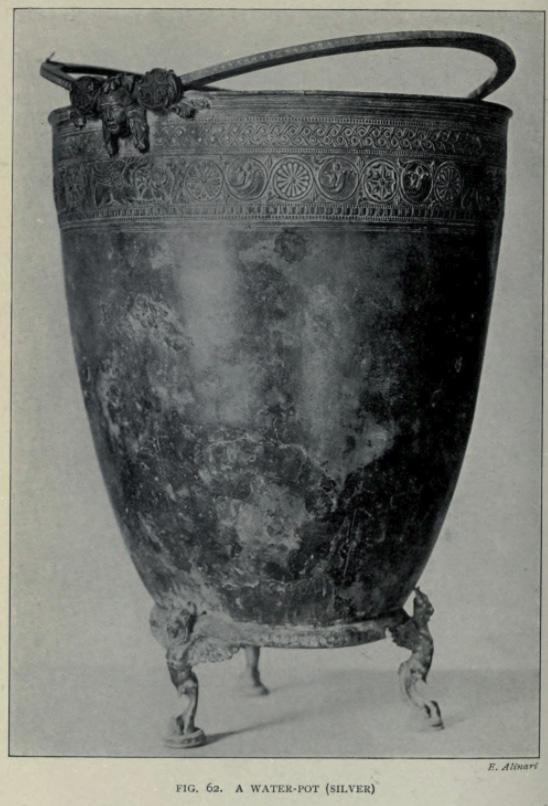
Water pot, excavated at Villa of the Papyri, ca. A.D. 79.

== History ==
The term "watering can" first appeared in 1692, in the diary of the keen cottage gardener Lord Timothy George of Cornwall. Before then, it was known as a "watering pot".

In 1886 the "Haws" watering can was patented by John Haws. The patent read "This new invention forms a watering pot that is much easier to carry and tip, and at the same time being much cleaner, and more adapted for use than any other put before the public."

The shower head end is called a rose, rose head, rosette, or sprinkler head.

== Modern uses ==
Watering cans are used by gardeners for watering plants, by road workers to apply bitumen to asphalt, as ornaments, and regularly in symbolic art pieces.

== In popular culture ==
- Impressionist artist Pierre-Auguste Renoir painted a work entitled A Girl with a Watering Can.
- John Cleese, in a 1963 Cambridge University Footlights Revue ("Cambridge Circus") sketch, "Judge Not", described a watering can as: "a large, cylindrical, tin-plated vessel with a perforated pouring piece, much used by the lower classes for the purpose of artificially moistening the surface soil".

== Gallery ==
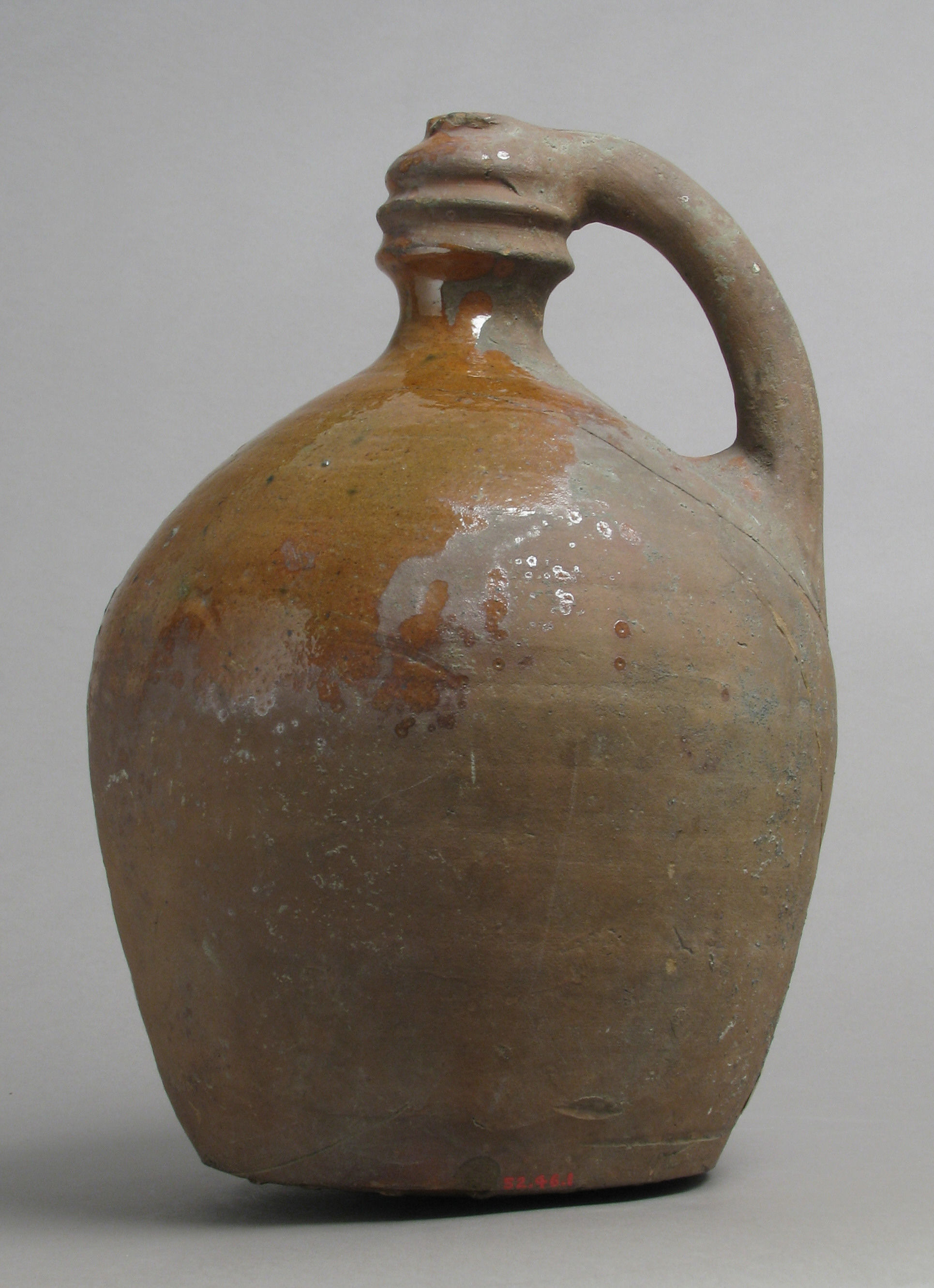
Watering pot (16th–17th century)

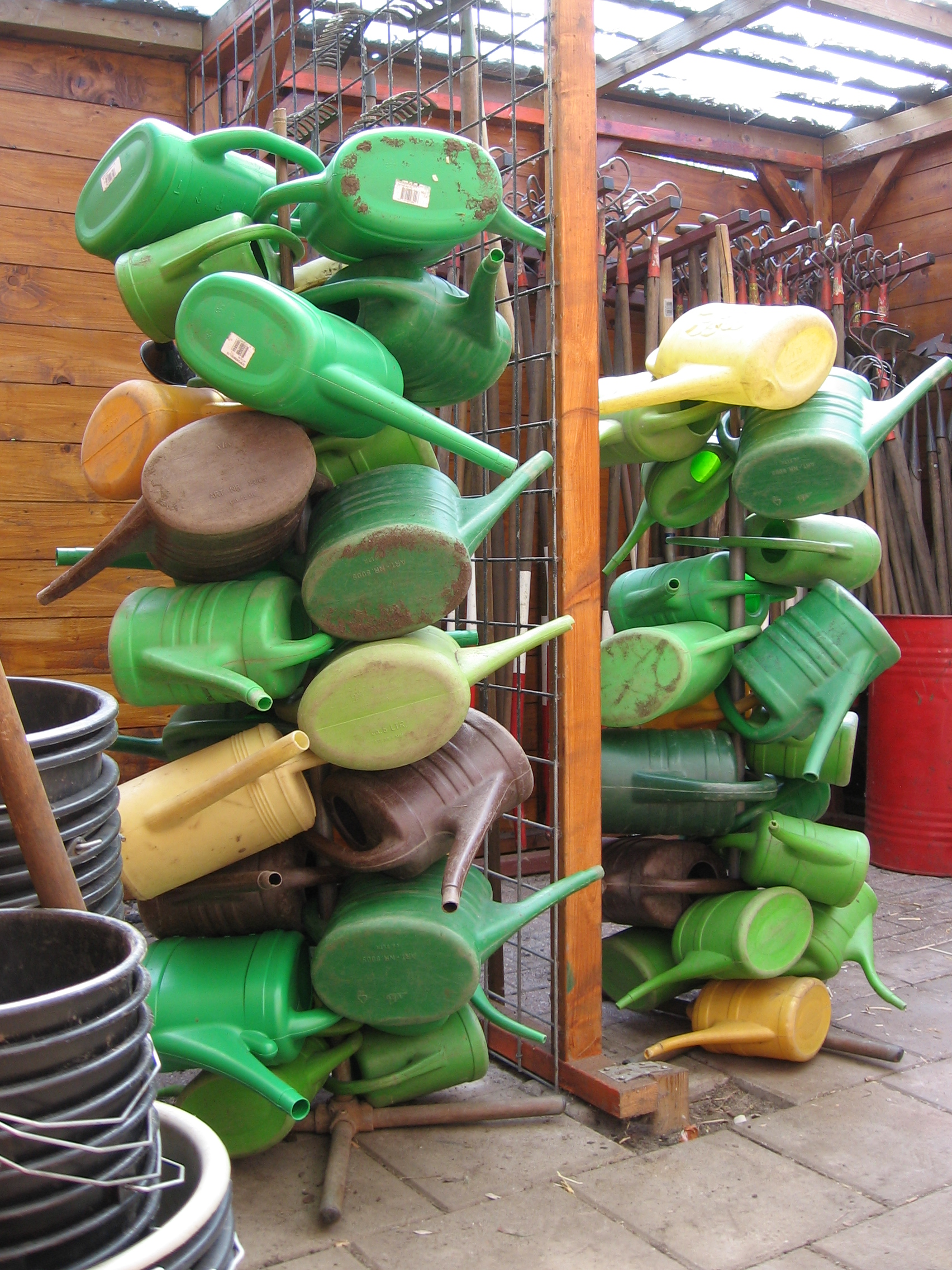
Watering cans on a stake in a school garden, Schooltuin Plutodreef Utrecht, the Netherlands

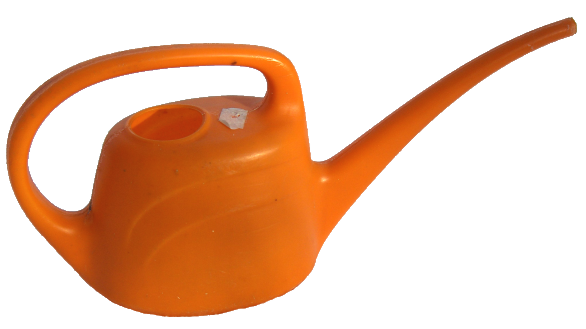
A watering can made of plastic

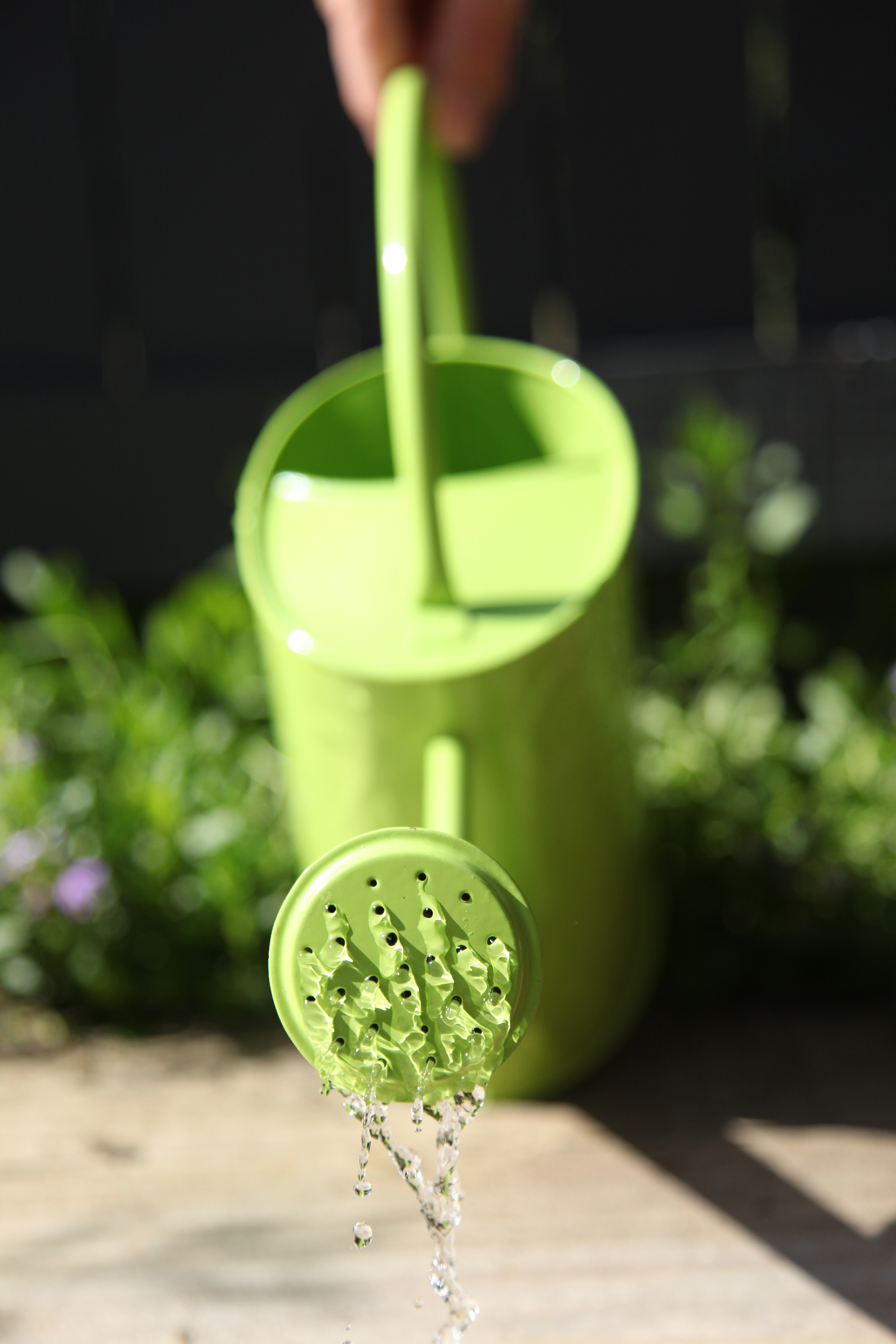
A green, 2 litre watering can made of galvanised iron pouring water

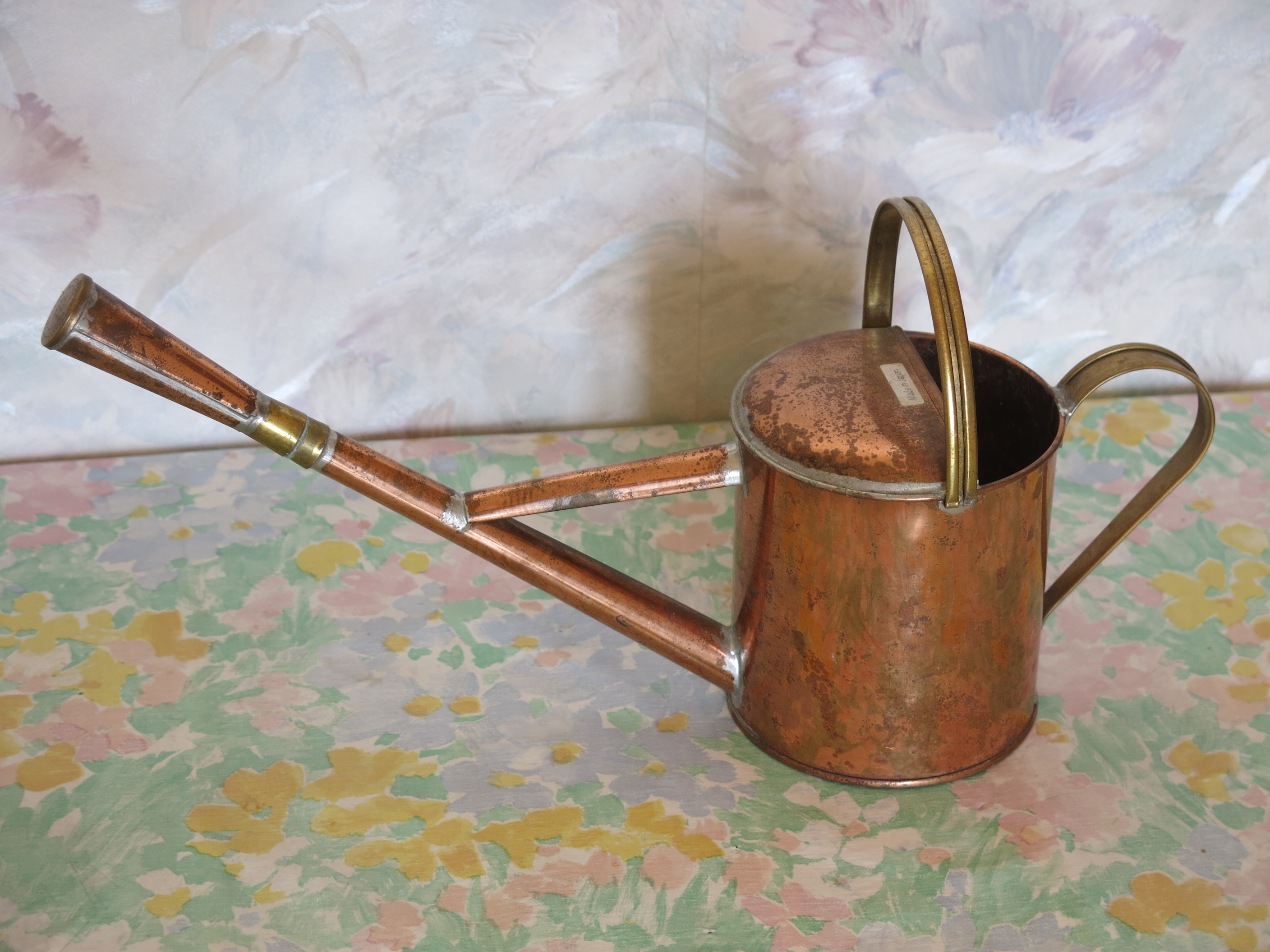
Watering can for bonsai

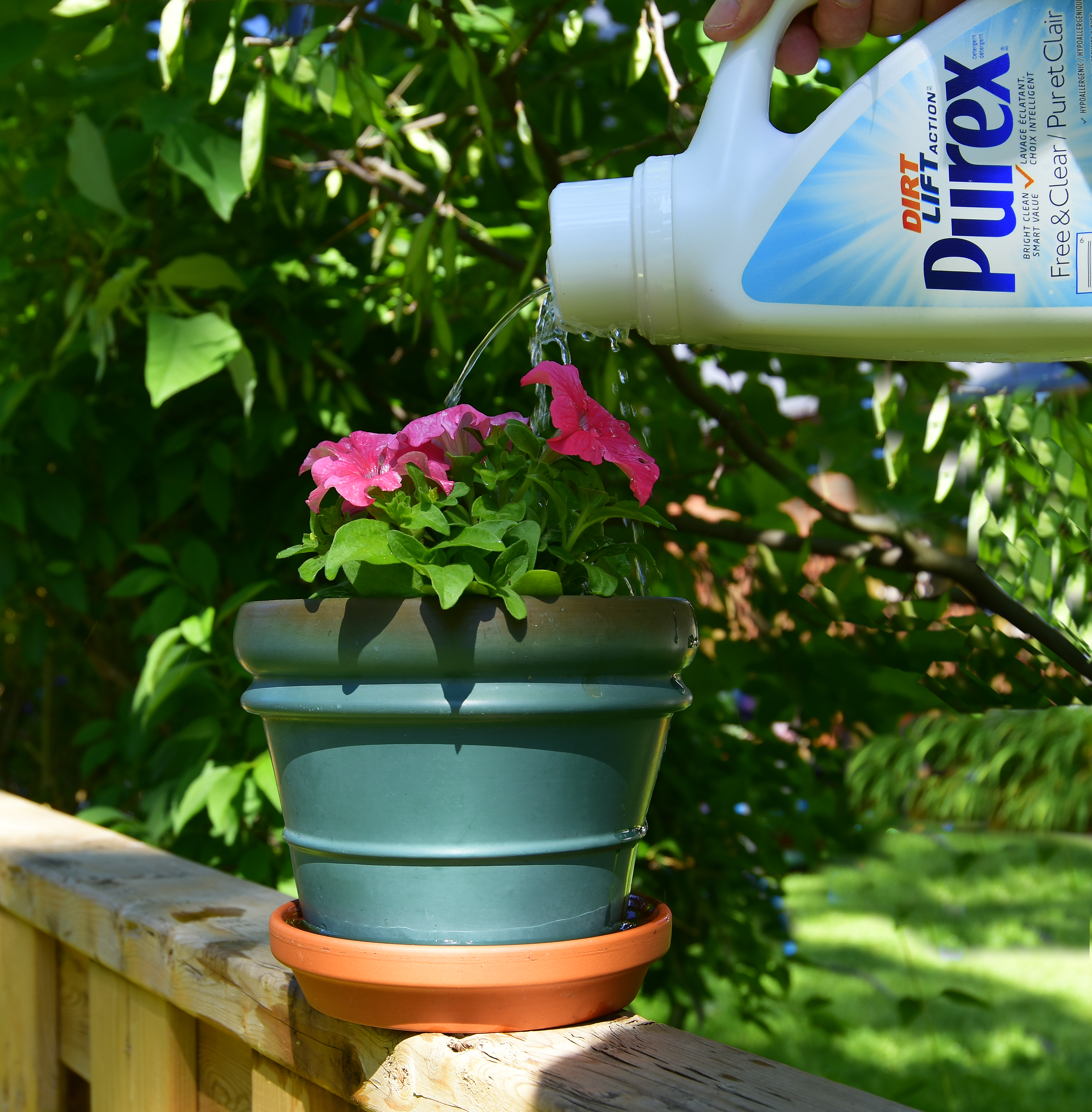
Watering can made from discarded container

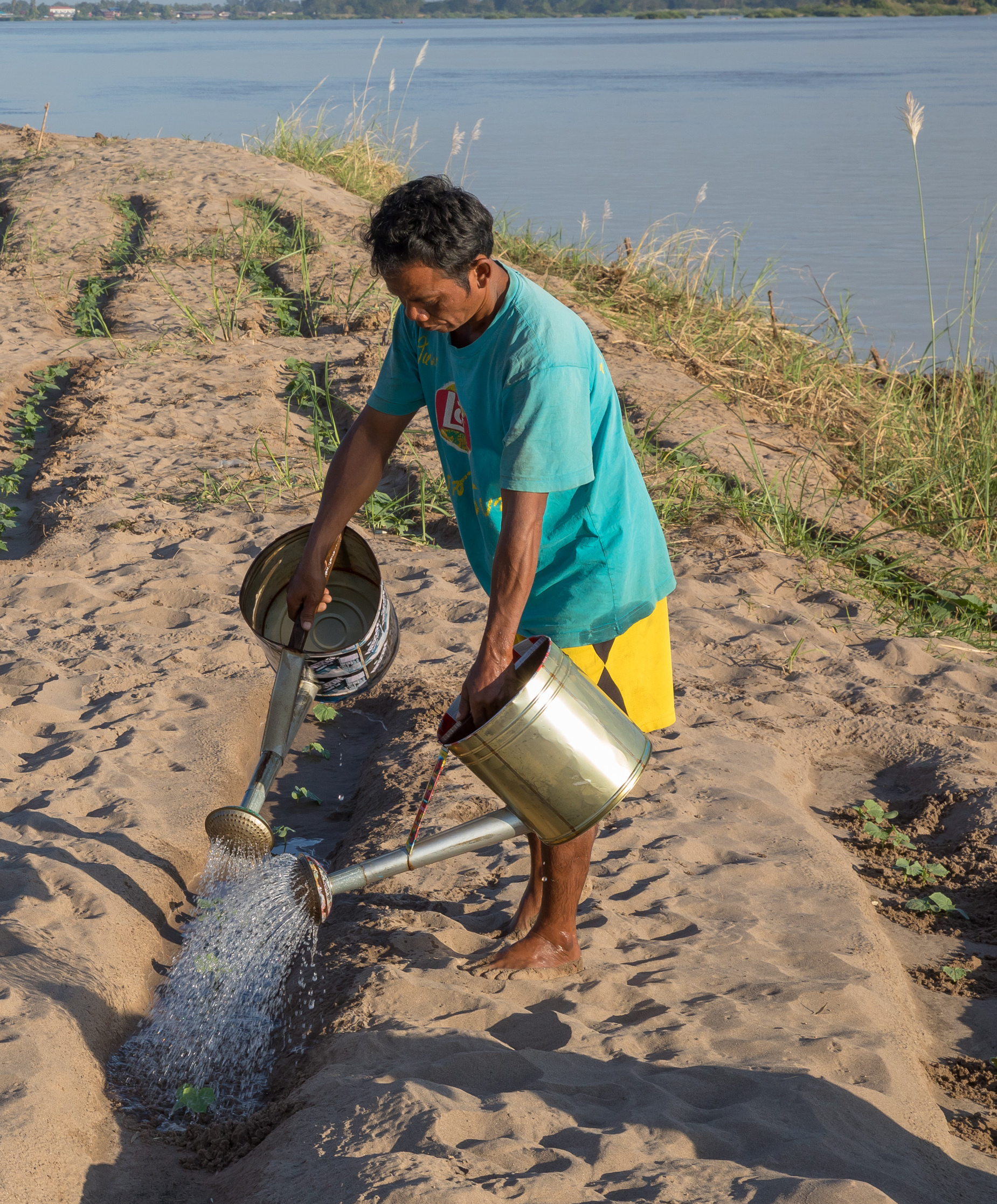
Person using two watering cans
