= A Girl with a Watering Can =

Painting by Pierre-Auguste Renoir

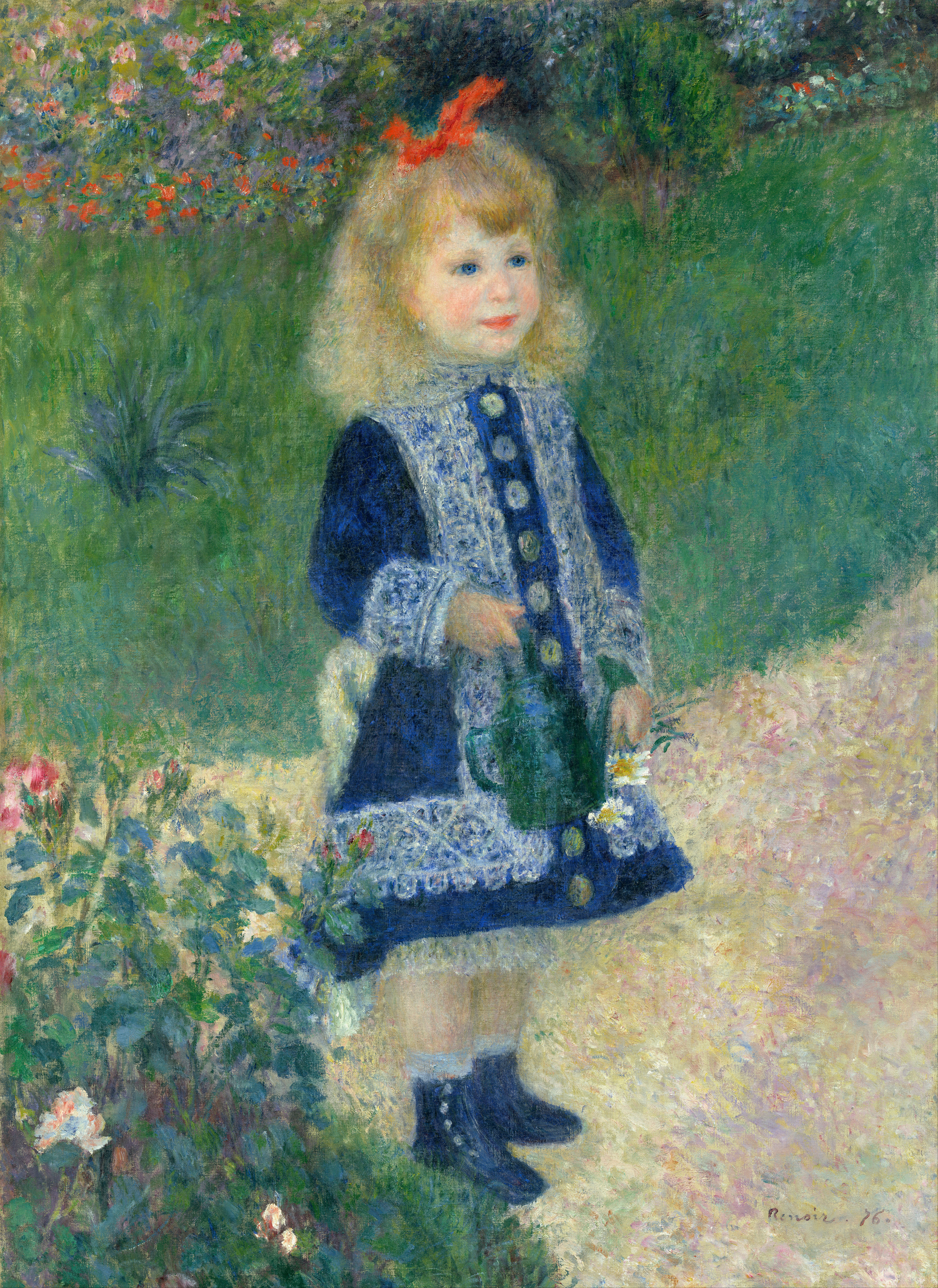
- Artist: Pierre-Auguste Renoir
- Year: 1876
- Medium: oil paint, canvas
- Dimensions: 100 cm (39 in) × 73 cm (29 in)
- Location: National Gallery of Art
- Accession no.: 1963.10.206

A Girl with a Watering Can is an 1876 Impressionist oil painting on canvas by Pierre-Auguste Renoir. The work was apparently painted in Claude Monet's famous garden at Argenteuil, and may portray one of the girls in Renoir's neighborhood in a blue dress holding a watering can.

The painting is in the National Gallery of Art, in Washington, D.C.

== See also ==
- List of paintings by Pierre-Auguste Renoir
