= Square foot gardening =

Method of divided garden beds

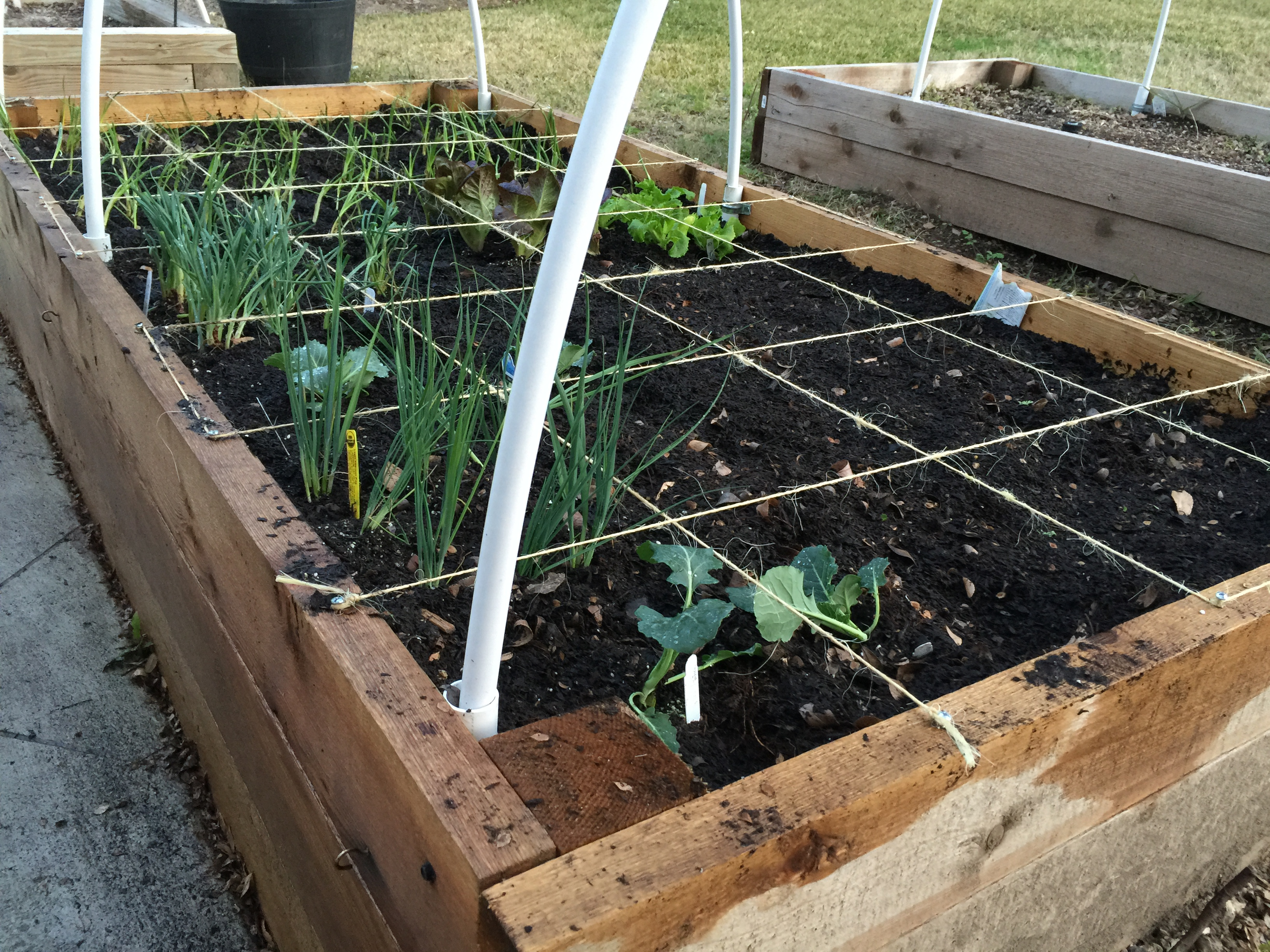
Square foot garden in raised bed

Square foot gardening is the practice of dividing the growing area into small square sections, typically 1 foot x 1 foot (30cm x 30cm). The aim is to assist the planning and creating of a small but intensively planted vegetable garden. It results in a simple and orderly gardening system, from which it draws much of its appeal. Mel Bartholomew coined the term "square foot gardening" in his 1981 book of the same name.

== Description ==
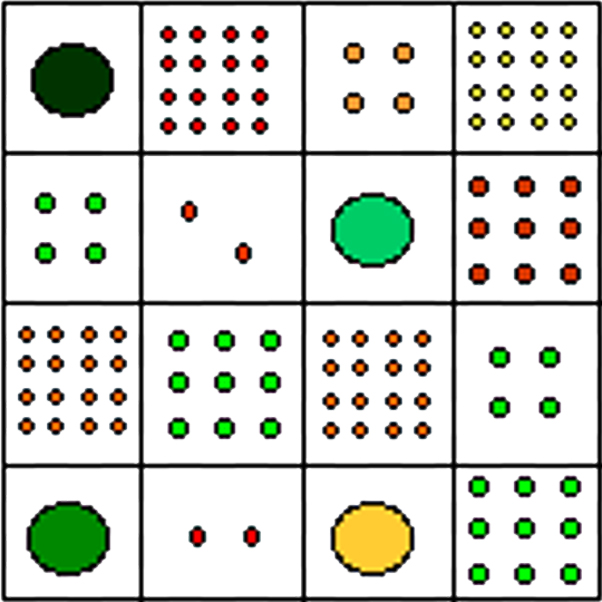
Diagram of a 4'x4' layout showing various planting densities per square foot

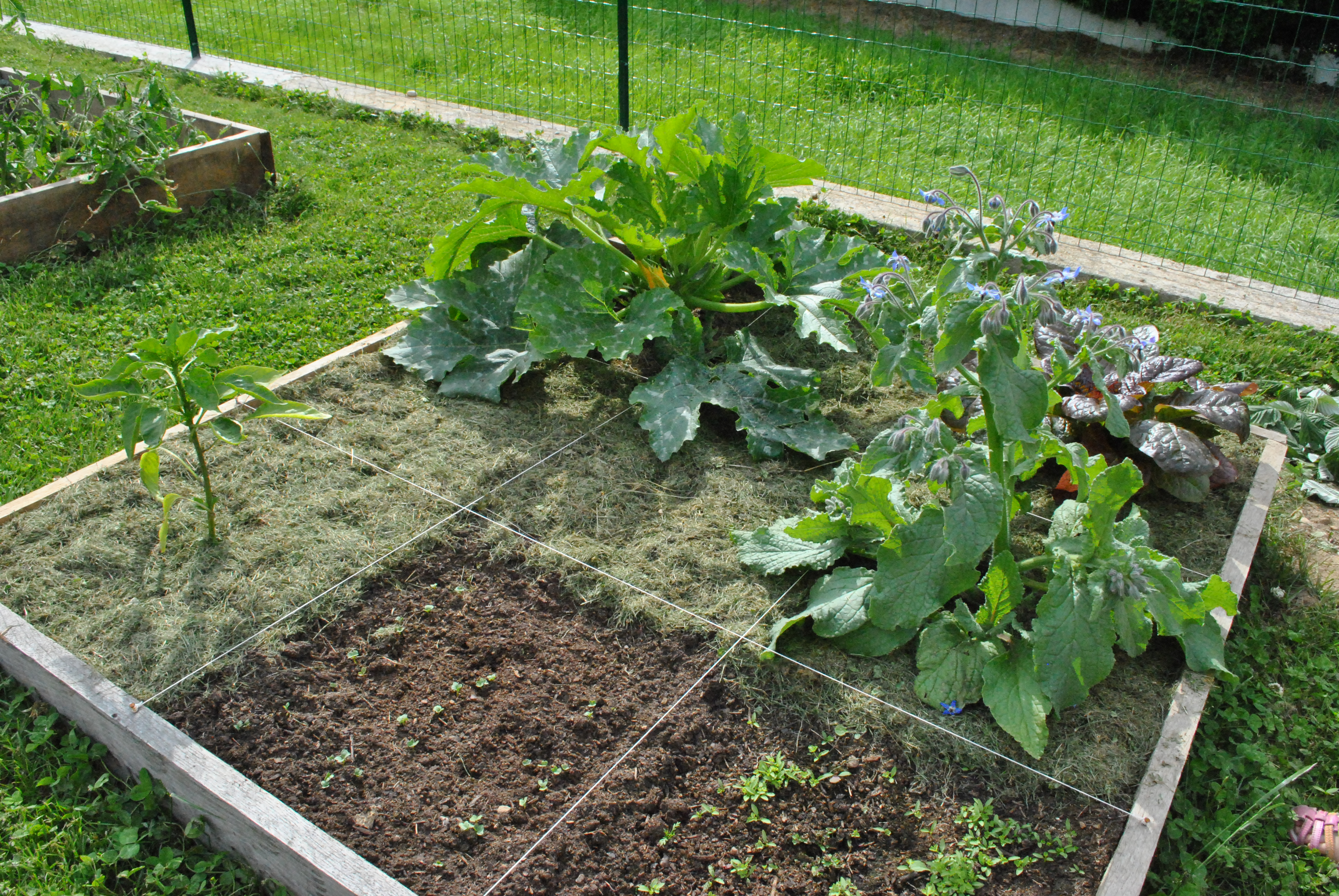
Strings are just a guide for plant spacing

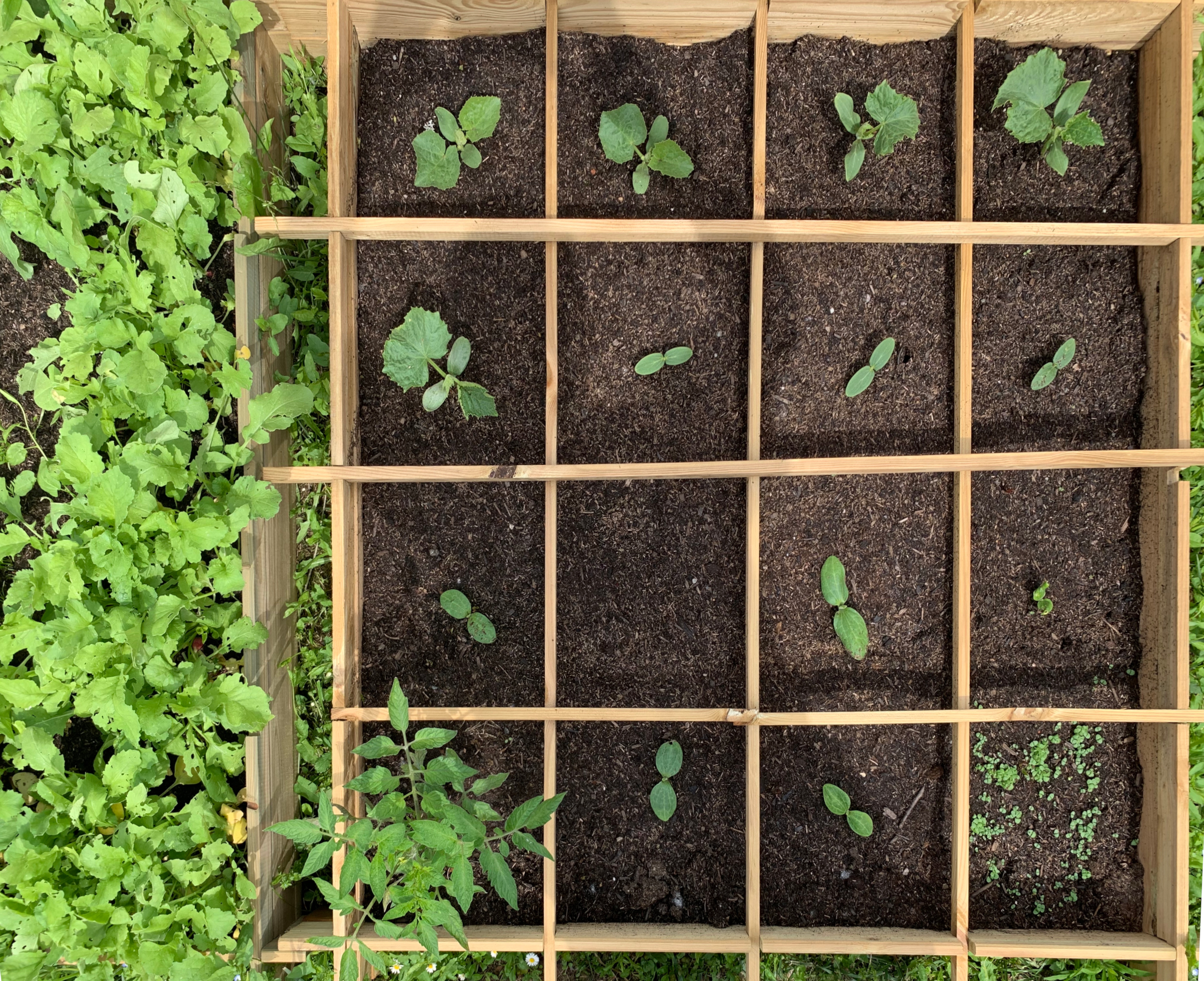
Wood dividers

The phrase "square foot gardening" was popularized by Mel Bartholomew in a 1981 Rodale, Inc. book and subsequent PBS television series. Bartholomew, a retired engineer, devised the system.

The square foot gardening method recommends using an open-bottom raised bed, 4 by 4 feet (1.2 m × 1.2 m) square. The square beds are then divided into a grid of sixteen one-foot squares. Each square is planted with a different crop, and based on the plant's mature size either 1, 4, 9 or 16 plants are placed per square. Although beds can be longer than four feet, it is recommended for the width of the bed to be no more than four feet because an adult arm can usually reach 2 feet—the distance from the edge to the center of the bed.

Once a "square foot" is harvested, a different crop can be planted. To encourage a variety of different crops in succession, and to discourage pests, each square is used for a different kind of plant (crop rotation) within the growing season. The number of plants per square depends on an individual plant's size. For example, a single tomato plant takes a full square, as might large herbs such as oregano or basil, while lettuce plants would be planted 4 per square, and up to 16 per square of plants such as radish or carrots. Tall-growing crops are planted or trellised on the north side of the bed (in the Northern Hemisphere) to avoid shading shorter plants.

One advantage of densely planted crops is that they can form a living mulch and can also prevent weeds from establishing or even germinating. A variety of crops in a small space also prevents plant diseases from spreading easily.

Since the beds are typically small, making covers or cages to protect plants from pests, cold, wind or too much sun is more practical than with larger gardens. To extend the growing season of a square foot garden, a cold frame may be built around it, and by facing the frame towards the equator, the square foot garden captures more light and heat during colder months of the year.

No specific soil is required although it is recommended to add compost to garden soil. In 2006, Bartholemew began advocating the use of "Mel's Mix", which he described as 1/3 peat moss or coconut coir, 1/3 vermiculite, and 1/3 compost which he claimed yields good results even at only 6 inches (15 cm) depth.

== See also ==
- Companion planting
- French intensive gardening
- Organic gardening
- Raised bed gardening
