= Haws Watering Cans =

World's oldest known watering can company

- Founded: 1886 in London
- Website: www.haws.co.uk

Haws Watering Cans, formed in London in 1886, is the world’s oldest known watering can company.

== History ==
Founder John Haws developed the watering can design still used by the company today while growing vanilla during his British Colonial Service in Mauritius. He patented the design and formed Haws Watering Cans, but died in 1913 before having the chance to accept a Royal Horticultural Society medal and an invitation to the inaugural Chelsea Flower Show in 1913.

His nephew Arthur Haws moved the factory from Clapton to Bishops Stortford. Following his death, in 1950 Taylor Law Co Ltd purchased the company, and developed new watering cans made from plastic. But the company folded during the 1970s recession, and was later restarted in 1982 by Eclipse Sprayers, run by father and son John and David Pennock.

The company is now run by David Pennock’s two sons Andy and Rich Pennock.

Haws Watering cans have featured in New York magazine The Strategist in 2018 and 2019. They have also been recommended by English newspapers the Independent and Telegraph, magazine Country Life and a Haws watering can was awarded the Dieline Awards 2020 Rebrand of the Year.

BBC Gardeners' World presenters Monty Don and Alan Titchmarsh have both endorsed Haws watering cans on a number of occasions.
