= Karen Washington =

Political activist and community organizer

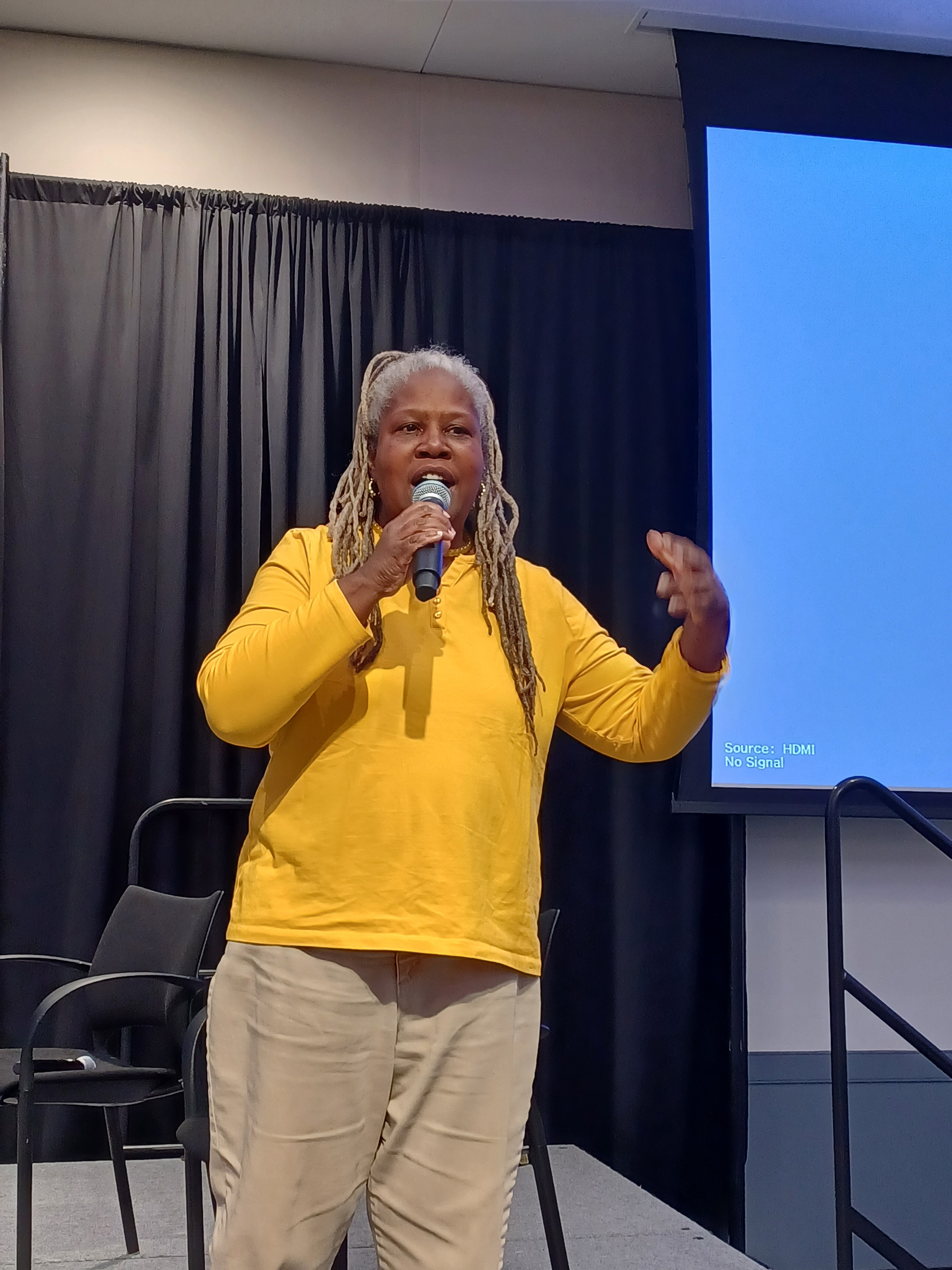
- Speaking in Atlanta in 2022
- Education: Hunter College; New York University
- Occupations: Community organizer, activist
- Awards: James Beard Foundation Leadership Award

Karen Washington is a political activist and community organizer fighting for food justice. She is the Co-Founder of Rise and Root Farm and the Black Farmer Fund.

== Biography ==
Washington grew up in New York City, attended Hunter College and received her master's degree in occupational biomechanics and ergonomics from New York University in 1981. In 1985, she moved from Harlem to the Bronx with her two children. Washington studied organic gardening at the Center for Agroecology and Sustainable Food Systems at UC Santa Cruz in 2006.

In 1988, after years of tending a garden in her backyard, Karen Washington helped found the Garden of Happiness in the Bronx. A decade later this garden teamed up with other community gardens in New York City to launch a farmers market. In the late 1990s Mayor Giuliani attempted to sell many community garden properties at auctions. Using various tactics such as protests, civil disobedience, and diplomatic negotiations, Washington and other community activists succeeded in saving the plots for continued use as community gardens. Washington returned to New York after completing the training program at UC Santa Cruz and founded Farm School NYC and Black Urban Growers.

In 2014, Washington began an apprenticeship at Roxbury Farm in Kinderhook, New York. After her apprenticeship, she "retired" to co-found Rise and Root Farm in Chester, New York.

In 2018, rather than using the term "food desert," she coined the intersectional term "food apartheid" to bring attention to social inequalities and injustices in the entire food system.

== Organizations ==
=== Farm School NYC ===
Farm School NYC provides agricultural training and educational opportunities for New York City residents. Through grassroots social justice and a community based approach this organization hopes to "inspire positive local action around food access and social, economic, and racial justice issues."

=== Black Urban Growers ===
They first began in 2009 with community events focused around food. In 2010 Black Urban Growers put on the first annual Black Farmers and Urban Growers Conference with over 500 participants. Their mission is "to engage people of African descent in critical food and farm-related issues that directly impact our health, communities, and economic security."

=== Rise and Root Farm ===
Co-founder of a sustainable farm in Orange County, New York that is cooperatively-run and women-led.

=== Black Farmers and Urban Gardeners Conference ===
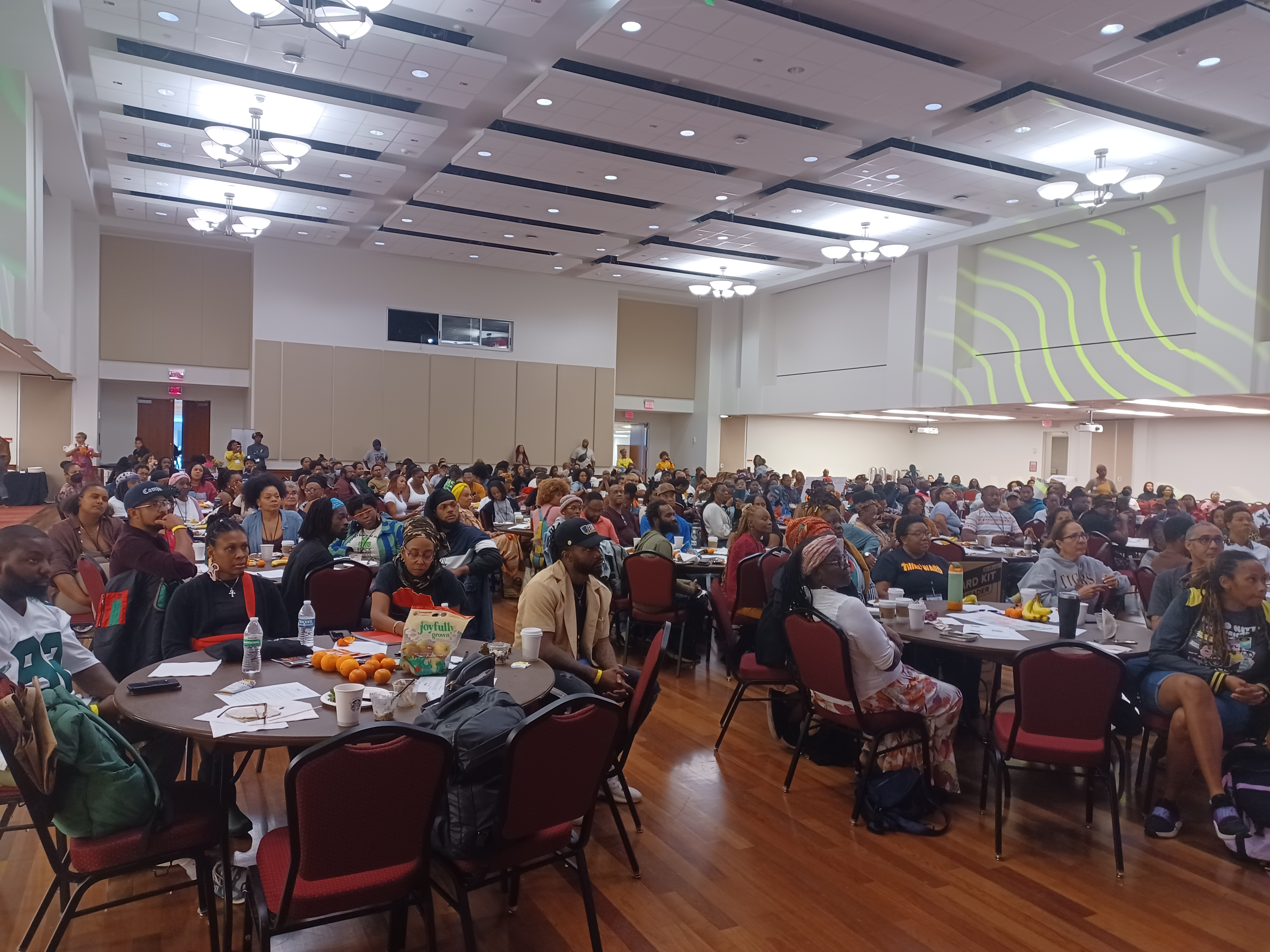
Black Farmers and Urban Gardeners Conference - 2024, Houston, Texas

The Black Farmers & Urban Gardeners Conference (BUGs) is an annual event focused on food justice, sustainable agriculture, and community empowerment in Black communities across the United States. It was founded in 2010 by Washington, Regina Ginyard, Lorrie Clevenger, and others following discussions held at the Northeast Organic Farming Association convening. The conference was established as a response to challenges faced by Black farmers and urban growers, including land loss, food insecurity, and limited access to agricultural resources. The conference was created to create a space for networking, education, and advocacy. The conference provides a platform for Black farmers, urban gardeners, activists, educators, and policymakers to collaborate on agricultural sustainability.

The first conference, held in 2010 in Brooklyn, New York, featured Will Allen as the first keynote speaker and drew more than 500 attendees. Allen, a MacArthur "Genius Grant" recipient and founder of Growing Power, emphasized sustainable food systems and urban farming. The conference has expanded to different cities across the U.S., that relate to regional agricultural concerns, knowledge sharing among Black farmers and food.

As of 2023, the conference was the largest of its kind dedicated to Black agriculture.

== Recognition ==
In 2012, she was named in Ebony's "Power 100" of influential African-Americans, and in 2014 she received the James Beard Foundation Leadership Award.

In 2021, Washington was named to the Forbes Women "50 Over 50" list.

In 2023, Washington was the co-recipient of the James Beard Humanitarian Award, along with Olivia Watkins and was named a "Food Hero" by the Food and Agriculture Organization of the UN.

In 2024, she was named an Emerson Collective Fellow.

== See also ==
- Urban agriculture
- Black farmers in the United States
