= Food justice movement =

Social movement addressing food insecurity

The food justice movement is a grassroots initiative which emerged in response to food insecurity and economic pressures that prevent access to healthy, nutritious, and culturally appropriate foods. The food justice movement moves beyond increasing food availability and works to address the root cause of unequal access to adequate nutrition. Like other Environmental Justice initiatives, the food justice movement advocates for rights-based solutions that identify the underlying human rights that allow individuals to achieve adequate food security and nutrition. This differs from policy-based solutions that focus on food availability and affordability by increasing food production or lowering the cost of food.

Food justice addresses various issues such as the ability to grow or purchase healthy food, diet-related health disparities, unequal access to land, and inadequate wages and working conditions in agriculture.

Food justice recognizes the food system as "a racial project and problematizes the influence of race and class on the production, distribution and consumption of food". This encompasses farm labor work, land disputes, issues of status and class, environmental justice, public politics, and advocacy.

Food justice is closely connected to food security and food sovereignty. According to Anelyse M. Weiler, Professor of Sociology at University of Victoria, "Food security is commonly defined as existing 'when all people, at all times, have physical, social and economic access to sufficient, safe and nutritious food which meets their dietary needs and food preferences for an active and healthy life'" Food sovereignty includes similar principles but differs from food security in that, "Food sovereignty involves a broader vision than food security, asserting communities' power to democratically manage productive food system resources such as land, water and seeds, and to engage in trade on their own terms rather than being subjected to speculation through international commodity markets." Food sovereignty advocates for a shift from corporate-controlled food systems to local food systems.

One component of food sovereignty is farmworker justice. Anna Erwin, Professor of Environmental Social Sciences explained some of the challenges that farmworkers who, "traditionally make low wages, have higher levels of food insecurity than the general U.S. population, and work regularly in dangerous conditions." Many farmworkers in the United States are undocumented immigrants who are less likely to mobilize against unfair working conditions out of fear of deportation and loss of employment. Regulations that have been put into place to protect farmworkers are oftentimes not enforced due to systematic issues and the before mentioned factors. Farmworker justice highlights the important role of farmworkers in food systems and necessitates farmworker rights to ensure their continued ability to feed themselves, contribute to the global food supply, and protect the environment.

It is argued that lack of access to good food is both a cause and a symptom of the structural inequalities that divide society. A possible solution presented for poor areas includes community gardens, fairness for food workers, nutrition education, and a national food policy.

Article 25 of the Universal Declaration of Human Rights states: "Everyone has the right to a standard of living adequate for the health and well being of himself and of his family, including food, clothing, housing and medical care and necessary social services, and the right to security in the event of unemployment, sickness, disability, widowhood, old age or other lack of livelihood in circumstances beyond his control."

The Food and Agricultural Organization of the United Nations states that the right to food is "The right to feed oneself in dignity. It is the right to have continuous access to the resources that will enable you to produce, earn or purchase enough food to not only prevent hunger, but also to ensure health and well-being. The right to food only rarely means that a person has the right to free handouts."

== History and background ==
Food injustices have occurred since the founding of the United States. Settler colonialism broke down Indigenous food systems and replaced them with settler food systems. European capitalist development encroached on Indigenous food systems in North America, "beginning with conquest over Indigenous food systems as a tool of war (first food regime), forced assimilation to a settler diet (second food regime), and finally appropriation of Indigenous cuisine for settler consumption (third food regime)". Indigenous communities have experienced centuries-long forced dependency on the government that continues to undermine their food security today.

In the early twentieth century, Jim Crow laws enforced racial segregation, and "relegated Black Americans in the nation's capital to segregated ghettos where housing was substandard, healthcare and education were inadequate, municipal services were limited, and environmental and food security were perpetually threatened by the forces of racial capitalism."

Igor Vojnovic, Professor of Geography and Urban and Regional Planning at Michigan State University, connects disinvestment to food accessibility. "Within this context, considerable research interest has been placed on examining the availability, accessibility, and quality of healthy food options within urban neighborhoods experiencing disinvestment and decline. Particular vulnerabilities have been recognized among poor, minority populations living within cities, who are faced with limited access to culturally appropriate and nutritious food within their neighborhoods."

A study published in 2022 "revealed evidence that living in historically redlined areas is associated with multiple adverse health outcomes including gunshot-related injuries, asthma, preterm birth, some cancer types, heat-related illnesses, and chronic diseases when compared to those living in non-redlined areas."

Individuals throughout the food system have petitioned for increased wages and improved working conditions, adding the treatment of workers to the conversation around sustainably produced food.

Efforts to unionize farmworkers occurred since the 1930s but were suppressed for decades. The United Farm Workers Movement (UFW) of the 1960s is an example of individuals in the agricultural sector organizing to advance their labor rights, such as improving working conditions and wages for farmworkers. Dolores Huerta and Ceasar Chavez leader this movement, organizing farm labor families in the fields, churches, migrant worker camps, and through door to door advocacy without foundation funding (cite Kohl-Arenas), creating a less professionalized base that was more participatory in nature. These activists were interested in using the UFW to achieve broader social change, recognizing the inseparability of civil rights and economic rights.

In collaboration with California grape growers, organizers of UFW helped workers gain rights to make decisions about health and safety risks in the workplace through collective action. In addition, farm workers achieved the right to unionize, marking a legislative victory for them.

The modern food justice movement was formulated in the early 1960s during the height of the civil rights movement. The Black Panther Party played a big role in the burgeoning food justice movement in the coming years. In 1969, they launched the Free Breakfast for Children program at a church in Oakland, California. Countless cities across the country adopted this model, and ultimately led Congress to increase funding for the National School Lunch Program and expand the breakfast program to all public schools.

A separate sphere of the food justice movement is that of the white community, whose trajectory in the movement differed from that of the black activists. In 1996, the Community Food Security Coalition (CFSC) was an important player in advocating for access to fresh fruits and vegetables. However, this group was composed of all white Americans and neglected to seek input from residents of the food insecure areas they attempted to help. According to Daniel Ross, Director of Nuestras Raíces, food security cannot exist independently of the specific community in discussion because of how central food and agriculture are to a community.

In 1996, the Community Food Security Coalition (CFSC) was an important player in advocating for access to fresh fruits and vegetables. However, this group was composed of all white Americans and neglected to seek input from residents of food insecure areas they attempted to help. It emphasized the consumption of local and fresh fruits and vegetables, and removed race from the conversation. Director of Nuestras Raices Daniel Ross points out that:

...food security cannot be divorced from the issues of concern to communities ... food and agriculture lends itself to addressing [racism and power imbalances] because food is so central to communities and, if you had working communities, you'd have justice and equality. ... At the heart is the element of justice.

Other scholars who have done research in food justice and related topics include Monica M. White whose research is focused on the primarily black community in Detroit. In her article Sisters of the Soil: Urban Gardening as Resistance in Detroit, she discusses the work of the Detroit Black Community Food Security Network (DBCFSN) which uses farming as a way to alleviate food insecurity and make political statements. White cites the National Health and Nutrition Examination Survey of 2005–2006 to point out that 52.9% of black women are obese, compared to 37.2% of black men and 32.9% of white women due to phenomena like food deserts and food insecurity. Because the socioeconomic status of black communities in Detroit are a huge part of the food insecurity issues black communities face, this serves as an example for the inseparability of food justice movements and social reform.

The United States Department of Agriculture (USDA) has the National Institute of Food and Agriculture (NIFA) which is a part of USDA's Research, Education, and Economics mission area (REE), NIFA is an agency that uses federal funding in order to address agricultural and food justice related issues that impact people's daily lives. This is a collaborative effort that uses scientists and research in order to locate and find solutions to issues in the agricultural chain. They use science-policy decision making, something to keep in mind when asking what problems are being fixed and for what purpose.

== Modern political response ==
Food access and justice is a contentious topic in current day legislation.

The movement was highly popularized during President Obama's two terms, largely in part due to his wife, Michelle Obama. President Obama passed the Healthy, Hunger-Free Kids Act in 2010, calling for a raised nutrition standard in the National School Lunch Program. Despite some Republican lawmaker pushback, the law went into effect. In 2020, the University of Washington School of Public Health found that since the passing of this legislation, children from low-income households had been eating healthier school lunches with better nutritional quality.

Supplementing the legal action taken by the President, Michelle Obama's activism in the political sphere led to the onset of programs like Let's Move!, that targeted decreasing adolescent obesity across the United States. Nevertheless, a decade later, certain scholars justified a decrease in funding towards these programs that are anchored on obesity reduction instead of food justice and equity.

In 2017, the Food Deserts Act was introduced to the House. The Act called for consistent grants for grocery stores in areas defined as formal food deserts. Grant money would be allocated to selling healthy foods that are locally sourced. This bill did not make it past an introduction in the House. Scholars suggest that this highlights limited support for food justice from Congress, despite food insecurity being a relatively bipartisan issue.

In 2018, through implementation reforms of the Affordable Care Act, Medicaid and Medicare have embraced a Food is Medicine (FIM) approach. FIM is a healthcare approach that integrates nutritious food into medical care in order to prevent and treat diet-related chronic diseases. Through Section 1115 waivers, Medicaid programs in states, such as Massachusetts, California, and North Carolina, have introduced FIM services within Medicaid, though the scope and type of benefits vary significantly by state. In 2018, the passage of the CHRONIC (Creating High-Quality Results and Outcomes Necessary to Improve Chronic) Care Act authorized Medicare Advantage plans to provide FIM benefits to enrollees. In 2021, within traditional Medicare, HR 5370 was introduced, which would have authorized testing of Medically Tailored Meals (MTM) interventions; however, it did not become law in that session.

A bill, the National Food as Medicine Act, was introduced to the Senate by U.S. Representative Barbara Lee (D-Calif.) in 2024. The legislation called for the establishment and expansion of FIM programs. It has yet to be passed as of May 2026. Another bill, introduced by California State Assemblymember Mia Bonta (D-Oakland) also in 2024, would have required Medicaid to cover medically supportive food and nutrition services. However, California Governor Gavin Newsom vetoed the bill.

In 2025, the passage of the One Big Beautiful Bill Act (OBBBA) led to large cuts to both SNAP and Medicaid, undermining the FIM reforms of 2018. There were funding reductions and stricter work requirements for SNAP, and millions lost coverage under Medicaid. At the end of 2025, with the government shutdown, SNAP benefits were disrupted and delayed.

Another bill, the Healthy Food Access for All Americans Act, was introduced to the Senate. The legislation called for tax credits and grant funding for opening grocery stores and food banks in food deserts. The bill was introduced in 2022, and it has yet to be passed as of May 2026.

== Research and theory ==
There is a plethora of research pertaining to community gardens, urban farming, and their impact on local communities. The literature tries to connect the activities of community gardens and urban agricultural projects to social, health, and economic outcomes. However, due to the overwhelming lack of diversity in the perspectives that inform the food justice movement, a new concept of just sustainability has been proposed. To address white and middle class culture dominating the discussion and priorities of organic food and sustainability practices, a more multi-cultural and intersectional approach is suggested that includes the narratives of historically marginalized communities.

=== Food movements and race ===
The food justice movement points out that many food activists and scholars, such as journalist Michael Pollan, fail to account for the social and economic constraints that shape the food habits and choices of certain groups, and overly emphasize individual choices. Food justice activists point out that communities of color have lost food sovereignty, and they note that racism and economic inequality prevent black communities in particular from having access to sufficient amounts of nutritious foods. This movement aims to reform the food system by addressing such structural inequalities and also by celebrating foods that are of cultural significance to different groups.

The intersection of race and food justice appears in the food justice movement, for example, in the San Francisco Bay Area and most notably in the city of Oakland. West Oakland, historically a neighborhood with a higher black population, has also long been known as a food desert, meaning residents must travel over a mile for fresh food. Thirty five percent of residents in this area also lack access to a car to drive to a store, a quarter of residents live below the poverty line, and diabetes is three times more prevalent in this neighborhood than in the rest of Alameda County.

On a national level, black households are twice as likely and Latinx households 1.5 more likely than white households to be food insecure. These disproportionate levels of food insecurity expose the systemic issues at the root of the problem. People are food insecure because they do not have room in their budget to buy sufficient food for themselves and their families, and the fact that people of color are more likely to be food insecure is because they are more likely to live in poverty. This goes back to societal issues of disinvestment in communities of color, with black communities in particular being less likely to have access to quality education, job opportunities, and knowledge of government assistance programs. This issue was brought to public attention during COVID-19, when food insecurity levels dramatically increased, particularly for black communities. One study in particular revealed that soon after the onset of COVID-19, food insecurity levels increased at a much quicker pace for a sample of low-income, primarily African American communities in comparison to the broader American population. The pandemic exposed which populations were most vulnerable; black people are more likely to work in high exposure jobs, less likely to have access to quality health care, and more likely to face bias by health care workers. It is these inequalities that led to the food justice movement in the first place: a movement that specifically addresses racial disparities in the food system.

78% of Native Americans live outside of tribal-designated lands, despite literature on food security and Native peoples almost exclusively being in the context of reservation residency, and there is often a difference in food security seen in urban and rural settings among these individuals (Tomayko et al., 2017). A study done with 240 rural Native American households, and 210 urban Native American households found that the average rate of food insecurity was about 61%, with 80% of urban homes being food insecure and 45% of rural homes being food insecure within the study (Tomayko et al., 2017). Native Americans are often excluded from studies on food insecurity, and research on Native American food insecurity and injustices are rare. The USDA Annual Household Food Security Report in 2019 neglected to include Native American individuals in their findings (Meredith, 2020). One of the first and only longitudinal studies of Native food insecurity at the national level was written by Craig Gunderson in 2008, although the US government officially defined a measurement of food insecurity in 1995 (Gunderson, 2008).

== Food Justice and Policy ==
Food justice emerged as a way of applying food security and anti-hunger movements to policy by drawing from established social and environmental theoretical frameworks. The food justice movement is related to food sovereignty in that it critiques "structural barriers communities of color face to accessing local and organic foods" that are largely due to institutional racism and the effect it has on economic equality. This movement seeks to create equal access to nutritious food for all people, regardless of race, and policy is one mode that this mission is accomplished through. One way that this policy in integrated is through food policy councils, which have existed in North America since 1982. The implementation of food policy councils at the city level has allowed for changes to respond directly to community needs, with communities being involved with the creation of policy.

Organizations and festivals such as the Coalition of Immokalee Workers, Familias Unidas por la Justicia, and Farm Aid are credited as working to raise awareness of or assist with food justice by fighting for family farmers to keep and sustain their land, fair pay and treatment of workers, and ensuring access to healthy foods to those previously denied affordable nourishment.

== Current injustices ==
=== Food deserts ===
Food deserts are defined by the USDA as census tracts that contain a notable population of low income people that lack access to healthy and affordable food, such as a typical chain grocery store within reachable distance. In food deserts, it is typical to see an abundance of fast food restaurants alongside gas stations and liquor stores with no fresh food, only offering bagged chips, sodas, and other quick eat items that lack nutritional substance, are available, alongside fast food restaurants that do not offer healthy options.

In a Report to Congress done by the United States Department of Agriculture, it was found that 23.5 million Americans live more than one mile away from a grocery store and do not have access to a car. There are concerns regarding individuals in food insecure areas that have to rely on public transportation to access local food markets to grocery stores. Urban planner Karen Washington of Johns Hopkins explains that residents in "food deserts" may have food, but the quality of such food is poor.

Some activists criticize the term "food desert" because the word "desert" implies something that exists naturally.

=== Food apartheid ===
In recent years, racial justice organizers began to label the lack of access to fresh, healthy, and affordable food as food apartheid, a term that reflects how structural inequalities that deprive poor communities of color from accessing to the same selections of food as richer white communities.

Ashante Reese, author of Black Food Geographies: Race, Self-Reliance, and Food Access explains that the anti-black racism and uneven capitalist urban development create conditions that can only be called food apartheid.

It is important to distinguish between the terms "food desert" and "food apartheid." "Food desert" describes a natural occurrence that can not be changed by human efforts. When this terminology is used, correcting a food desert can be visualized as physically changing the landscape of a geographic desert into a wetland. The task is impossible, thus the language does not motivate efforts to change the food landscape. On the other hand, "food apartheid" contextualizes inadequate food access as systematic and institutionalized. That is, the term exposes the root cause of food injustice. It was constructed by mankind and engrained in our systems and institutions. Changing this systemic failure can be done by changing institutional practices.

=== Farmworker Justice ===
One component of food justice, and in some cases food sovereignty, is farmworker justice. Environmental Social Scientist Anna Erwin explained that farmworkers "traditionally make low wages, have higher levels of food insecurity than the general U.S. population, and work regularly in dangerous conditions." Many farmworkers in the United States are undocumented immigrants who are less likely to mobilize against unfair working conditions out of fear of deportation and loss of employment, which can lead to workers getting caught in harmful cycles of dependence. Farmworker justice highlights the important role of farmworkers in food systems and necessitates farmworker rights to ensure their continued ability to feed themselves, contribute to the global food supply, protect the environment, and maintain their inalienable rights.

A report created by The Center for Agriculture and Food Systems at Vermont Law and Graduate School and the organization Farmworker Justice discussed the regulatory structure currently being used to protect farmworkers from the dangers of pesticide use in agriculture. It found that enforcement of laws and regulations in specific states is low due to systematic issues that cause farmworkers to not report breaches in the adherence to regulations that have been put in place to safeguard farmworkers and consumers.

Farmworkers are submitted to completing continuous work without breaks in high-temperature working conditions. There is no nationwide rule requiring employers to provide paid breaks on hot days. With climate change making temperatures more extreme, farmworkers are threatened with ever increasing health and mortality risks. According to Public Health scholar and physician Lee Newman, "Overheated workers sweat and may get dehydrated. Their hearts work harder to pump more blood into their straining muscles and to their skin to cool off, while shifting blood flow away from organs such as the kidneys, stomach and intestines. Workers can become lightheaded, limiting their ability to think clearly. Inflammation can leave their tissues more susceptible to damage. Overworked and oxygen-starved cells may begin to break down and die." There are countless stories about farmworkers subjected to high-temperature situations that have resulted in death.

==== Actions being taken ====
Legal groups are taking action by working with immigrants to bring their cases to court. This begins the process of establishing legal precedents that prevent farmworker injustices. One example includes a case that was brought to the Connecticut state court by Yale on behalf of migrant farmworkers against the farmers who hired them through the federal H-2A temporary agricultural worker visa program. This program provides visas for immigrants to come here legally and work seasonal agricultural jobs filling a necessary gap in the agricultural workforce.

One example includes a case that was handled by faculty and students at Yale Law School from the Worker and Immigrant Rights Advocacy Clinic (WIRAC). The case was a class action lawsuit on N. Casterano Greenhouses & Farms, where the company was accused of exploitive recruiting and hiring practices of migrant workers through the federal H-2A temporary agricultural worker visa program whose rules and regulations they violated.

The lawsuit claims that the defendants have unlawfully breached their contracts "by creating an atmosphere of fear and domination," which enabled them to use coercive tactics for personal gain. The complaint claims the defendant abused the H-2A program to force economically vulnerable Mexican migrant workers into forced labor and a cycle of dependence. The last major event in the case was on March 13, 2026 where the court denied in part a motion to dismiss meaning that the case will continue forward.

The Penn State Worker Protection Standard Program provides compliance and technical assistance to agricultural producers and there employees to help them understand and comply with the requirements of the Federal Environmental Protection Agency Worker Protection Standard. This helps agricultural employers better understand the regulations they have to uphold and it helps the farmworkers know their rights and enables them to hold their employers accountable. The efforts made by this program and those involved is an example of working to improve conditions for farmworkers.

The Farmworker Justice Organization is a national nonprofit organization that seeks to empower farmworkers and their families to improve their working and living conditions, health, access to justice, and immigration status. They do this through administrative supervision, free community education, representation in the court of law, providing services that promote health, and being active allies to farmworkers and their larger causes.

== Contemporary structural inequities ==
=== Agriculture ===
Gender, race, and nationality all play a role in who receives government support. "White farmers have long been beneficiaries of loans and subsidies from the USDA designed to discourage over-production and enable access to new technologies. This support was historically denied to black farmers, Native American farmers, Latino/a farmers and women farmers."

The food industry has become dominated by large corporations that control every aspect of the food chain from seeds and agricultural technology to production and processing. A small number of people control a growing majority of the world's food.

=== Indigenous Americans ===
Most of the farms in the United States exist on stolen land from legislation such as the Indian Removal Act of 1830. This land was then portioned among white settlers for extremely low costs, through legislation such as the Homestead Act. Prior to European colonization of the Americas, the indigenous people that inhabited America had various regionally unique food resources.

In 2020, it was reported that one in four Native Americans lacked reliable access to healthy food and had a much higher risk for diet-related diseases. American Indian and Alaska Native adults were 50% more likely to be obese and 30% more likely to suffer from hypertension compared to white Americans. They are also 50% more likely to be diagnosed with coronary heart disease, and three times more likely to have diabetes.

Valarie Blue Bird Jernigan, the executive director of the Center for Indigenous Health Research and Policy, posited that these levels of food insecurity were a direct result of colonization. Her Community-based Participatory Research (CBPR) study on the Round Valley Reservation in Mendocino County, California, found that the 4,000 residents studied had nutritionally poor diets because of lack of access to fresh foods. The Round Valley Reservation's only sources of food during the study was a single grocery store located in the town over, with a fried chicken fast food restaurant inside, where 85% of its shelf space was dedicated to prepackaged foods. The only other source was reported to be a gas station which sold prepackaged snacks and hot dogs.

Currently, up to 85% of Native American peoples on Reservations take part in food assistance programs, one of them being the US Department of Agriculture's (USDA's) Food Distribution Program on Indian Reservations (FDPIR). The foods that these programs distribute are often canned and prepackaged, inevitably being high in salt, sugar, and fats as well as low in vital micronutrients. Jernigan commented that reform would be necessary to target unequal health outcomes for Native Americans, explaining that her ideal solution was increased efforts to focus on providing Indigenous food sovereignty, a specific policy approach that would work to mobilize communities using multi-millennial cultural harvesting strategies.

The capitalist agro-industrial complex has resulted in the promotion of GMOs and large-scale organic farms undermine Indigenous food sovereignty. "Indigenous worldviews and values of the webs of mutual care between humans and ecosystems inform careful stewardship that also provides fish, game, and other wild foods."

Non-tribal regulatory frameworks exclude traditional tribal food systems and sovereignty. "For Plains Indians, food sovereignty is directly tied to re-establishing bison herds within their reservations and traditional lands. While food security can be enhanced through U.S. government programs, food insecurity over the long term can inadvertently be perpetuated through these programs by preventing re-ownership of food procurement practices; combined with meager inclusion of traditional Native foods, this can disrupt tribal food sovereignty."

=== Black Americans ===
Black Americans also experience unequal access to healthy food. In the aftermath of slavery, many black men became landowners, but between 1865 and 1910, some of this land was stolen from them through underhanded legal practices and violent acts. Many were also left unable to own any land, resulting in black people being forced to sharecrop on other people's land. White supremacist violence and discriminatory money lending policies, many of which were instituted by the US Department of Agriculture, allowed for white developers to easily acquire properties. In 1920, black Americans owned 14% of American farms. In 2017, that proportion had gone down to 2%.

The inability to farm and grow one's own food on one's own land prevented many communities from achieving a sustainable food system with equal access to good nutrition. The executive director of the National Black Food and Justice Alliance, Dara Cooper, stated that for food justice to be achieved within many black communities, these communities would require the ownership and control of the businesses and institutions that deliver said food.

Beyond farming discrimination, since the end of the Great Recession, the income disparity between black and white households widened. The intersection of socioeconomic inequality and the racial history of how black Americans have been allowed to control the production of food creates a higher risk for black Americans to face food insecurity. Food mirages explain the concept of grocery stores being present, but healthy items within them being financially out of reach for their customers.

Harlem, New York is a neighborhood that highlights much of the radicalized nature of food injustice. Harlem was 87.6% black in 1990. Past and current resident Angela Helm explains that at the time, the neighborhood would have been described as a food desert. Spurred by a real estate transformation, Starbucks locations began to open and President Bill Clinton moved his office into the neighborhood. As such, rents began to skyrocket and the landscape shifted. Residents protested the opening of Whole Foods, which drew in white neighbors and produce that remained unaffordable for residents and their families. Gentrification is a phenomenon that disproportionately impacts black residents in urban areas, and also their access to food.

A similar phenomenon can be seen in New Orleans, Louisiana. Following the destruction wreaked by Hurricane Katrina, New Orleans East was still home to 73,000 predominantly African American residents. This neighborhood in itself would constitute the fourth-largest city in Louisiana, yet the entire neighborhood has not a single grocery store.

To target these disparities in economic capital, Soul Fire Farm, an Afro-Indigenous centered community farm, created a reparations map make these efforts more effective. Additionally, other scholars have proposed nutrition incentive programs that would provide cash matches for food stamps spent on fruits and vegetables in markets and grocery stores. Such benefits would apply to both the Supplemental Nutrition Assistance Program (SNAP) and Special Supplemental Nutrition Program for Women, Infants, and Children (WIC).

While structural barriers largely influence Black communities, it is important to understand the agency and active resistance of Black communities, used to create livable places and expressions of Black culture. This is discussed further in the following section.

=== Hispanic & Latino communities ===
Interpersonal factors that are more common in Hispanic and Latino families and contribute to higher rates of food insecurity include intergenerational poverty, sending funds to family outside the USA, limited English proficiency, lower education, higher likelihood of being a single parent household, cultural traditions limiting food access or choice, and lack of sufficient social support.

Research shows that Hispanic families whose income rose above SNAP's income limits struggled to afford food, as requirements for eligibility had not been updated to reflect economic changes. Some households failed to renew their SNAP benefits due to work obligations that inhibit their ability to keep appointments and complete required paperwork.

Moreover, immigrants from South America have to balance the stress of maintaining their cultural and ethnic identity while also adopting the cultural traditions of a new country.

=== Residential segregation ===
According to Alana Siegner, Professor of Energy and Resources at University of California, Berkeley, "Deeper historical and structural challenges including poverty, racism, and divestment in specific communities and neighborhoods are increasingly being recognized as the root causes of the current problem of unequal access to sufficient supplies of safe, nutritious, affordable, and culturally acceptable food." These structural inequalities pose unique challenges for minority communities that have been historically and structurally disadvantaged. Urban agriculture is often cited as a remedy for issues related to food access in low-income urban areas, however, structural changes must occur to address the systems that have caused these issues in the first place.

Food apartheids and the lack of access to food stem from socioeconomic injustices that disproportionately affect low income black communities. According to the ACLU, food deserts are the direct manifestation of structural inequities that have been solidified over time. These institutional racisms that have resulted in a lack of access to healthy food for minorities are innumerable—but among them include housing policies leading to segregated communities and financial policies leading to commercial flight.

"White flight" is a phenomenon central to residential segregation and can be described as the aversion of white people to living in neighborhoods with minority populations, especially in sizable numbers. As minorities move into neighborhoods in inner cities, affluent white residents move to outer rings of the city with newer housing.

According to Professor of Sociology Aristide Sechandice, "Besides decreasing the population of the city in favor of the suburbs, it diminished the tax base of the cities, creating a cycle of urban decline. The more affluent inhabitants, with sufficient money to relocate and the greatest capacity to pay taxes, exited the city, rendering municipal governments susceptible to fiscal crises."

These policies have all interacted over time to contribute to health disparities among communities.

In 1962, 61% of white Americans shared the sentiment that "white people [possessed] a right to keep blacks out of their neighborhoods if they [wanted] to, and blacks should respect that right." Despite years of policy changes a result of the civil rights movement, 30 years later in 1990, a Detroit survey of whites found that a quarter of white respondents would not move into a neighborhood that was more than 50% black. Discrimination towards people of color continues to influence real estate practices, while public policies and institutional discrimination continue to reinforce race segregated living patterns. Although segregation by race is illegal, it has not ceased to be the standard in America. Living patterns are not only correlated with access to educational opportunities, and employment opportunities—they are also correlated to access to food.

Studies published by the American Journal of Preventive Medicine have found that low-income neighborhoods and minority neighborhoods are less likely to have access to large supermarkets. Federal government policies have directly hindered the development of supermarkets in black populated communities. As middle-income white people got subsidized government loans to move from cities to suburbia, businesses, including supermarkets, relocated with them. Grocery stores and retailers alike, were supported by the United States government to relocate to the suburbs—catering to the White middle class and leaving the cities desolate.

Another housing issue related to food justice is the phenomenon of green gentrification. Green gentrification is the idea that as initiatives to promote nutritious food in communities such as community gardens and farmers markets grow, neighborhoods become more appealing, and attract wealthier residents. These resources which were originally implemented to benefit low-income and marginalized communities then end up being used by more privileged populations. This was seen in Oakland, California, when a community garden started by the food justice organization Phat Beets was shown in a real estate ad. Issues such as this one have led to many food justice organizations incorporating other social justice issues such as gentrification and affordable housing into their missions.

=== Health outcomes ===
Research links many health issues to the lack of nutritious food, and since food insecurity disproportionately impacts people of color, so do these health conditions. For example, cancer, diabetes, and other nutrition-related health conditions are disproportionately seen in communities of color. According to the Centers For Disease Control, obesity has been linked to a wide range of health problems including Type 2 Diabetes, cardiovascular diseases, various types of cancer, hypertension, and high cholesterol among both adults and children.

Individuals must often choose between paying for food and other necessities, causing individuals to choose cheaper food that is often less nutritious to have enough money to pay for other expenses. Many low-income residents become dependent on emergency food services and food pantries. According to the Alameda County Community Food Bank Hunger Study report, "food is often the most critical factor in our clients' health."

Diet-related illnesses are present in low-income communities due to price barriers rather than consumer's poor decision-making. Therefore, "greater food availability or capacity to purchase food does not ensure sufficient nutrition. Consumption of cheap, calorically dense but non-nutritious starches has increased over the years, resulting in epidemics of obesity and diet-related diseases." Making produce available to consumers does not allow for them to make heathier choices if that produce is not affordable.

In a 2004 study done by medical doctors and public health professionals of New York's Icahn School of Medicine at Mount Sinai, a community coalition study was done to compare the availability and cost of diabetes-healthy foods in a black populated neighborhood in East Harlem with that of the adjacent white, wealthy Upper East Side in New York City. Researchers surveyed 173 East Harlem and 152 Upper East Side grocery stores to find whether or not they stocked five basic diabetes-diet recommended foods. Results showed that only 18% of East Harlem stores stocked the recommended foods, compared with 58% of stores on the Upper East Side. Further, they found that only 9% of East Harlem bodegas (convenience stores) carried all five recommended items while 48% of Upper East Side bodegas carried the items. This discrepancy is an example of how structural inequalities such as lack of access to healthy foods perpetuate high levels of type 2 diabetes in the black community.

=== College and university campuses ===
Compared to the general population, which is 10.5% food insecure, 44% of college students experience food insecurity. Increased tuition and college expenses combined with limited access to financial aid resources are contributing factors that limit access to sufficient and nutritious food. This causes higher rates of poor physical health, increased mental health issues, and results in reduced academic performance or dropout among students who are food insecure when compared to their food secure peers.

The neoliberalization of higher education has intensified existing structural inequities, resulting in challenges for financially strained students. This shift has disproportionately impacted first-generation, BIPOC, queer, and nonbinary students, leading to higher rates of food insecurity within these groups. As a consequence, these students face greater obstacles in accessing adequate nutrition and maintaining their well-being while pursuing their education.

Throughout North America, there has been a large movement from students and administrations to incorporate more sustainable food systems into higher education institutions through creating new academic programs, promoting farmers' markets and community supported agriculture, making changes to dining operations, and/or establishing campus farms and gardens. At Temple University, students were responsible for initiating and maintaining the Temple Community Garden. The University of Toledo offers over 16 courses relating to gardening. At Cleveland State, the university provides financial support to community organizers who operate a local farmers market.

According to Kami Pothukuchi, an Urban Studies and Planning Professor at Wayne State University, "Of all food system activities, community gardens offer excellent, low- cost possibilities for community engagement, service learning, curriculum development, and even research, among other social benefits for students and staff."

Although campus gardens have improved student awareness of sustainable practices and healthy eating, a lack of paid staff support and resources hinder its ability to significantly and immediately aid food-insecure students. Food pantries have emerged at colleges and universities to increase food access for students; however, many do not accept fresh produce, impacting the nutritional value of the foods offered.

During COVID-19, SNAP benefits were expanded to allow college students to qualify, supporting over 3 million college students in the form of $700 million in food assistance per month.

== Food sovereignty ==
Food sovereignty is defined in the Declaration of Nyéléni as "the right of peoples to healthy and culturally appropriate food produced through ecologically sound and sustainable methods, and their right to define their own food and agriculture systems." It revolves around the issues of "self determination, global uneven development, and ecological degradation," issues commonly associated with the Global South and rural Global North. Other common areas of food sovereignty discourse include issues of scarcity, environmental factors, population growth, and allocation of resources. Food sovereignty often places emphasis on property rights of indigenous communities and small-scale farmers.

The food sovereignty movement in the United States was inspired by the Belgium-based international La Via Campesina movement, and focuses on the right to produce food. This movement challenges current neoliberal approaches to solving food insecurity, and introduces a radical restructuring of the food system. Food sovereignty takes a more rights-based approach than other forms of food movements, where every individual has the right to culturally appropriate, sustainably produced food.

=== Black American Communities ===
Black communities use food sovereignty as an exhibition of agency under structural constraints. It allows them to provide food for themselves and strengthen their communities.

Ashante Reese describes the ways in which the Black community in Deanwood, Washington, D.C. meets their food needs. She describes their efforts in resisting structural inequities as "quiet expressions of refusal." Their efforts are self-initiated and target the most pressing needs of the community. For example, the people of Deanwood have developed a community garden to increase their self-reliance on food. The garden has become a community center providing a social network, beyond strictly a food network. Parents send their children to volunteer in the garden as a supplement to traditional daycares. The garden has deepened trust between members of the community and sparked involvement in community issues. Broadly, the resistance efforts of Deanwood show the strength and resilience of the community. The people are invested in their future and work to push the community ahead.

A similar narrative can be found in Toledo and Dayton, Ohio. Brittany Jones analyzes Black Urban Agrarianism in the cities as a form of community engagement beyond food. Projects of self-reliance such as the Gem City Market act as "disruptor[s], with the intention of revitalizing Black empowerment and resilience." Resistance to inadequate food systems is an expression of agency which builds on the assets of Black communities. Jones connects this idea to Monica White's theory of Collective Agency and Community Resilience.

Monica White builds her analysis on a study of Detroit, Michigan. She explains that urban Black people are using food resistance strategies as more than just survival techniques. They are a pathway to rebuilding their communities, which have been disrupted by racist structures and histories. The Detroit Black Community Food Security Network (DBCFSN) is an example of such resistance. The DBCFSN works to resist racial capitalism by emphasizing community gains and cooperation. It goes beyond simply providing alternative food structures and works to expand political education as well. The Detroit community is self-determined, and uses food-sovereignty as a means of self-reliance.

=== Global food security ===
Colonialism is a major source of food insecurity in the Global South. Colonialism had a direct impact on those who depended on seasonal farming due to prolonged droughts in certain regions, however, colonial policy often made important pasture and water resources legally inaccessible. Food insecurity has been perpetuated by post-colonial policies more recently through the inflation of food prices, aggregation of cropland, and displacement of groups from land available for food crops. Similarly, colonial policies that encouraged the planting of cash crops for export over subsistence crops has continued to affect food security in the Global South. Many Global South countries have subsequently become dependent on food aid from Global North nations.

Increasing numbers of people in countries in the Global North have used food banks since the outbreak of the COVID-19 pandemic as higher costs of living affect the affordability of food. However, according to Tina Bartelmeß, a professor of Food, Nutrition, and Health at the University of Bayreuth, "The number of chronically as well as transitory food insecure households is significantly higher in the Global South, currently especially in high-concern hotspots like African and Arab countries, than in the Global North." The reason for uneven distributions of food insecurity globally can be attributed to various structural inequalities related to political stability, economic security, environmental events, and access to health services.

According to Le Danh Tuyen of the National Institute of Nutrition, " Southeast Asia is second only to sub- Saharan Africa in the percentage of its people who live in poverty, and, with its larger total population, the number of impoverished people is actually higher than Africa's." Uneven distributions of wealth cause large populations to remain impoverished and undernourished. For example, the average income of a resident in Bangkok, Thailand is twenty times that of a resident in the rural northeast. War and poor governance can prevent food insecure individuals from achieving food justice. In Burma (also referred to as Myanmar), where 90% of the population lives in poverty, the ruling junta spends 40% of its budget on the military which is quick to shut down protests over the high cost of food. Natural disasters such as typhoons and hurricanes in the Philippines and Indonesia affect harvests and can decrease food security through increased prices or limited supplies.

During the Berlin Conference in 1884, European nations divided Africa between them, giving each exclusive control over separate territories. Through indirect rule, native authorities were tasked with collecting taxes and overseeing export quotas, food requisitions, and labor recruitments. As demand for resources in Europe and North America increased with industrialization, the production and exportation of crops increased exponentially, undermining food security. Clearing land and mono-cropping compromised peoples' abilities to hunt, fish, and grow nutritious food for themselves.

Manipulation of scales and abuse of power increased the wealth gap of elites and the larger community. Although sub-Saharan Africa is a net exporter of agricultural goods, this region suffers from rates of severe food insecurity upwards of 27%. According to André van Rooyen of the International Crops Research Institute for the Semi-Arid Tropics, "A five-fold increase in population since independence has exacerbated the problem, leaving SSA four times more affected than any other region and with food insecurity increasing."

=== Indigenous communities ===
Indigenous food sovereignty activists argue that indigenous communities have been systematically displaced from their traditional foodways, which has led to mass food insecurity. They assert that the most effective way to achieve food security for indigenous groups is for those groups to be more involved in the production of their own food. Some activists also argue for food sovereignty as a means of healing historical trauma. Food sovereignty of indigenous groups is also closely linked to seed sovereignty and plant breeders' rights. This is because seed saving is an important practice both culturally and for the preservation of a large enough seed stock to feed communities.

A localization of food systems would restore Indigenous communities' capacities for achieving agency or the ability to determine the type of food they eat and its production methods. The neoliberal model of food security that has been imposed on Indigenous populations negates the cultural diversity, human relations, and ecologies that exist in their communities. Indigenous food production includes hunting, fishing, gathering, and other traditional food provisioning practices beyond crop production.

High rates of food insecurity among Native peoples is juxtaposed by the reality that current American cuisine is largely dependent on Native American food culture, with the influences of potatoes, beans, corn, peanuts, pumpkins, tomatoes, squash, peppers, melons, and sunflower seeds. The indigenous food sovereignty movement has climbed to the forefront in combating food insecurity among Native peoples to incorporate back these traditional foods in their communities. With this is the increasing support for Tribal governance on Native lands to hopefully increase accessibility to these traditional foods, increase the support of home food production, and educate on the traditions of gathering, preparation, and preservation of food.

== Food justice interventions ==
=== Urban or community farms ===
Community gardens, according to the American Community Gardening Association's (ACGA) mission statement, are essential catalysts for the neighborhood and surrounding community. They have the potential to combat food insecurity in providing healthy food options that are economically and environmentally sound, in addition to being a space for recreation, therapy, beauty and education.

In addition, having communal gardens may also benefit immigrants and refugees who use gardening as a way to immerse themselves in new surroundings while also getting a chance to reconnect with their culture and receive food for their family and community. This epitomizes how the Center for Rural Affairs sees the working of the community food system of which at its core aims to, form a connection between those who grow or make the food and the consumers. Despite the great change and development community gardens bring, many in these communities had to fight for the right to use the land for gardening which was evident in the 1960s with "guerrilla gardening" tactics to combat land scarcity and resist the, "inequalities between the powerful and powerless." Today, according to the ACGA annual report, 61% of community or urban gardens are found on government lands, indicating the important role local governments play in the use of community gardens through the implementation of opposing legislation or strict land use policies.

Issues of land tenure pose significant threats to community gardens and farms. Public lands that formerly served minority and immigrants are often forcibly closed when private investors buy land for development projects. Examples include La Finquita in Philadelphia, South Central Farm serving predominantly Latino households in L.A., Free Farm in San Francisco, and Brooklyn Community Farm in NYC.

=== Produce availability ===
The US has subsidized and marketed highly processed foods into global markets, changing local diets and economies of food around the world to fuel its capitalist economy.

Equity in both the decision-making process and the distribution of resources is the core of the food justice movement and can be achieved through government policies. One possible course of action to combat food deserts may be in mandating that corner stores and such in food deserts provide some variation of fruits and vegetables. For instance, in Minneapolis, the Department of Health and Family Support understood, that residents in food deserts, who were unable to travel to grocery stores or farmers markets, purchased their staple foods from convenience stores, which also carried more unhealthy quick foods rather than fresh produce. To combat this issue the Minneapolis City Council passed an ordinance requiring Minneapolis corner stores to carry "five varieties of perishable produce" and the Minnesota Department of Health requires, "WIC-certified stores to carry a minimum of seven varieties (and thirty pounds) of fresh produce." However even with the ordinances North Minneapolis residents who, "shopped most often at corner stores... did not purchase produce from them," due to factors such as produce being out of sight or not fresh.

Another possible solution to food injustices and specifically food injustice may be in making new regulations providing that there be more grocery stores in urban and rural areas. The USDA also sees this as an issue in stating that 2.2 million Americans have difficulty in accessing large grocery stores due to have to travel over a mile in urban areas or more than 10 in urban areas may increase reliance on convenience stores and restaurants(fast food), resulting in a poor diet and diet-related health problems. The USDA recognizes that the limited food access in Urban core areas, "are characterized by higher levels of racial segregation and greater income inequality." In small-town and rural areas with limited the lack of transportation infrastructure." However not all chain groceries will go into small neighborhoods due to the risk and upkeep, For places like West Oakland in California, where about half the residents do not have a car, access to grocery stores is even more so a struggle.

=== Food vending ===
There are other innovations from the nonprofit, social enterprise sector that show promise for connecting residents with limited access to fresh food to sources of fresh produce. New Roots Fresh Stop Markets were created in 2009 with the express purpose of "igniting community power for fresh food access." Fresh Stop Markets are fresh food markets that pop up biweekly in urban fresh food insecure communities in Louisville, Kentucky, southern Indiana, and in two rural Kentucky towns—Hazard and Brandenburg. Families agree to cooperate with each other and pool their resources—SNAP Benefits and Debit/Credit—on an income-based sliding scale, a week ahead, purchasing in bulk from local, organic farmers. This big buying power creates an opportunity for farmers to sell to a committed group with no risk, while families benefit from wholesale prices. Each family receives the same share (bag) of fresh, seasonal produce regardless of what they pay. Fresh Stop Markets always feature a chef or culinary enthusiast who demos fresh, plant-based dishes, distributes recipes and shares information and support. Veggie cheerleaders advocate for the vegetables so that everyone feels comfortable with the varieties offered. Fresh Stop Markets are volunteer driven by shareholders so that everyone from children to older adults can offer to share their knowledge with others. There are also nonprofits with the "Food is Medicine" approach, which provides medically tailored meals for residents with chronic diseases.

==== SNAP and other food assistance programs ====
Another solution to potentially combat the food injustice, both in terms of quality and quantity of food, is in government provided subsidies and vouchers to help alleviate financial burden in affording food, as well as making healthier options available. The U.S. Federal government, as many other governments has put in much of its resources, approximately 50 billion dollars per year towards nutrition assistance programs. SNAP, Supplemental Nutrition Assistance Program, is funded by the federal US government under the Food and Nutrition Service (FNS) in the 1960s that according to one of their publications, "improves health, enhances self-sufficiency, and alleviates food insecurity." The Public Policy Institute has conducted research showing that the introduction of food stamps has reduced illnesses attributed to poor diet such as diabetes and increased average birth weights among adults who had access to the program since their youth.

Research shows that SNAP has reduced hunger and food insecurity for participants of the program, including children. Although SNAP may remedy the problem of undernutrition, there are other health risks that this food voucher program does not solve. Research indicates that SNAP authorized retailers in lower income communities consistently offered fewer fresh fruits and vegetables, whole-grain foods, and low-fat dairy than higher income communities. According to a recent pediatric study,"Children participating in SNAP were more likely to have elevated disease risk and consume more sugar-sweetened beverages (SSBs), more high-fat dairy, and more processed meats than income- eligible nonparticipants."

Food vouchers such as CalFresh had success in reducing "food insecurity among low-income households" during the recent recession. However, despite the efforts made by these comprehensive assistance networks the United States has failed to make little to no advancement towards reducing food insecurity to 6% , relative to 1995 when measurements of food inequity within households began.

Another federal assistance program is the Special Supplemental Nutrition Program for Women, Infants, and Children (WIC). WIC provides healthy foods and nutrition education to pregnant or breastfeeding women, and children under the age of five. Similar to the EBT card, the program utilizes a California WIC card and an app for beneficiaries to have easy access to their benefits. Research shows that WIC was "associated with an acceleration of growth in weight and length/height" in infants and children, and that another study demonstrated a "significant decrease in prevalence of anemia after participating in WIC for 6 to 11 months". In addition, because WIC participation also "reduced low birth weight (<2,500 g) and very low birth weight (<1,500 g) rates by 25% and 44%, respectively", the US General Accounting Office concluded that "WIC was a cost-effective program because, for each federal dollar spent, between $2.89 and $3.50 was saved during the first 18 years of life". Another federal effort is the Gus Schumacher Nutrition Incentive Program, which provides produce prescriptions to SNAP beneficiaries, intended to be a partnership between healthcare professionals and community partners. A study found that the odds of food insecurity were "39% lower among >6-month group [of the Gus Schumacher Nutrition Incentive Program] than among first-time participants".

There are children's and summer food programs enacted in various states including California that allow either free or reduced lunches for those living in food deserts and underprivileged neighborhoods. These initiatives allow these individuals to have food security by providing them with access to foods that would otherwise be unattainable for them. Because schools are pivotal institutions in securing food availability, the USDA has done its part in having more healthy and wholesome food options available. New items have been added to school lunches, such as frozen rather than canned mixed berries and vegetables, grilled chicken breast fillets, egg patty rounds, and white whole wheat flour.

==== Education ====
Many argue that simply increasing availability and providing vouchers will not solve the food justice issue in regards to food deserts, which is where the argument for nutrition education comes in.

Nutrition education has been shown to improve food insecurity and quality of life. However, health issues for food secure individuals are a result of differences in wealth, income, occupation, and education combined. Therefore, "Nutrition education which focuses on individual choice and motivation as the only determinants of one's diet may therefore be perceived as unhelpful or patronizing in the face of these larger barriers."

According to a study, within the first year government-subsidized supermarkets in high need neighborhoods households were reported to have a significance effect on food availability and consumption habits. Reasoning behind this includes that individuals formed reliance on their usual supermarkets and the abundance and affordability of processed foods. Due to these reasons, overall lower income families bought less healthy food than wealthier families, however there were even greater disparities found, "between families with and without a college education." These results suggest that in order to improve a person's diet and change perceptions it is essential that there be education on diet and health on top of increasing food accessibility and affordability. However the affordability of food may in fact influence food choice if the government chose to not only subsidize fruits and vegetables but also tax fast food, "to improve weight outcomes among children and adolescents."

One way education about food justice is being implemented is through an interdisciplinary curriculum developed by the Stone Barns Center for Food and Agriculture called Food Ed. The curriculum is designed to help students "think critically about the way nutrition intersects with culture as well as the environment and farming" so that they can "help to create a healthier food system for all of us." As of 2019, the curriculum has been implemented in 37 high schools nationwide as an elective.

==== Genetically engineered crops ====
While many food justice interventions function at more localized scales, food injustice is both systemic and complex, and touches on the uneven global allocation of finite resources. The global food scarcity ideology is at the heart of many corporate food justice campaigns, and entities including Bayer campaign on feeding the world - and therefore cultivating more just societies - by using genetic engineering crops. Reports have questioned both the efficacy and ethics of GE crops as food justice strategies. These interventions also pose risks that threaten other pillars of just and ecologically viable societies; critics of GMOs cite the harms of overproduction, as well as decreasing genetic diversity of crops which can lead to wipe out due to invasive species.

== Initiatives Working Toward Food Justice ==
=== Farmlink ===
Farmlink is an initiative helping to reduce food waste by linking surplus production to food banks where the food can help those who are food insecure. Farmlink was founded by two college students, Aidan Reilly and James Kanoff. In Farmlink's first two months of operation, they transported more than one million pounds of surplus food to donation sites and as of 2022 they have worked with over 100 farms and 300 communities in the US to distribute enough food to make more than 64 million meals.

=== Double Up Food Bucks' Program ===
This program was started by a four-year federal grant by the U.S. Department of Agriculture and awarded through the Gus Schamacher Nutrition Incentive Program. It provided approximately 3 million dollars to initiatives providing access to fruits and vegetables to low-income families, other at risk communities, and tribal communities. This program allows SNAP shoppers to "stretch their food dollars further with the 'Double up' match, bringing home healthy food for themselves and their families".

== Criticisms ==
Working locally allows organizations to directly solve issues of hunger in their immediate communities, and this work is often successful in providing more nutritious food to disadvantaged communities. However, critics of the food justice movement argue that working locally also prevents larger structural changes from occurring. Most organizations work around the neoliberal food system in place, and mitigate damage done by this system instead of taking down the system itself. NGOs are an important part of the food movement, yet these NGOs require outside funding which some argue depoliticizes the movement.

To remain strong in their values and their mission, some in the movement argue that no connections can exist between their organizations and outside companies that do not align with their goals. However, these organizations need money to have a strong impact, and face the challenge of finding a balance between radicalism and realistic change. Similarly, there is concern that the food justice movement will end up becoming an "empty signifier" on food labels as a means of greenwashing and false advertising- a concern that becomes more real when organizations are forced to turn to outside companies. Food justice has a longer history in the US than other movements such as food sovereignty, and was initially seen as politically strong with its roots in groups including the Black Panthers. However, more recently, critics argue that food sovereignty is leading to more effective restructuring of the unequal food system.

== See also ==
- Food Security
- Sustainable agriculture
- Slow Food
- Fair Trade
- Fair Food Program
- Agroecology
- Right to food
