= Phat Beets Produce =

American food justice collective

Phat Beets Produce is an American food justice collective focusing on food justice in North Oakland, California, started by Max Cadji and Bret Brenner in 2007. Their programs include weekly farmer's markets (sourcing from local farmers of color), free produce stands, youth gardens, community supported agriculture programs (called the "beet box"), food and social justice workshops, and previously, a kitchen and cafe cooperative. Cadji helps residents have access to nutritious food by coordinating between farmers, institutions, and low-income communities to utilize empty land for urban gardening.

Their mission addresses disadvantaged North Oakland residents, actively opposes the systematic forces of gentrification in the North Oakland Area, and stands in solidarity with criminal justice issues. The organization states that it draws largely from the Black Panther Party, whose founding members lived in the North Oakland area. The Black Panthers focused on black empowerment and racial issues, but also addressed food justice issues, most notably their Free Breakfast for Children program.

Phat Beets has four community produce spaces located around Oakland: North Oakland Children’s Hospital, Arlington Medical Center Farmer’s Market, Arlington Medical Center Produce Stand, and the Saint Martin De Porres Community Produce Stand. Three gardens grow their produce: Healthy Hearts Garden (Dover Street Garden), 59th street spiral gardens, and BEET DOWN! Acres.

The "beet box" is now run by the non profit organization Acta Non Verba: Youth Urban Farm Project. Acta Non Verba: Youth Urban Farm Project is founded and led primarily by women and People of Color, and has a similar mission to elevate life for youth and their families in Oakland through urban farming and access to the natural environment.

== Ideology ==
Phat Beets is a social justice organization that takes an open position on food justice and other social issues, like housing justice, gentrification, and racialized processes within the criminal justice system, to address a variety of issues that relate to each other in hopes of helping community members in need and taking an active role in attempting to solve social problems. The organization believes this approach follows the theory of Intersectionality, in that individuals experience multiple forms of oppression at the same time, which shapes their identity.

Food and housing justice are connected because they share similar factors, like place-based city planning and policy, transportation regulations, and commercial real estate development that change and subsequently affect the environment of the food and housing justice movements. Phat Beets has also mentioned that racialized processes are in line with food justice because a minority community’s lack of access to nutritious and affordable food is partially a result of racist policies that prevented the accessibility to healthy food in low-income minority communities in the first place, like the investment into suburbs and capital structure after World War II that left minority groups in the city without access to grocery stores. Phat Beets has stated that gentrification is also in part caused by racialized policies that push minority groups farther away from their homes and healthy food.

=== Food justice ===
According to the Just Food organization located in New York City, “Food justice is communities exercising their right to grow, sell, and eat healthy food.” Phat Beets believes that everyone deserves the right to have healthy food that is affordable and easily accessible. In order to help strengthen food justice in Oakland, part of the Phat Beets mission is to create opportunities for local farmers and businesses, connect the community to food justice, and find different methods of making healthy food accessible

Phat Beets believes it provides farmers of color in Oakland more opportunities to be profitable because the organization's mission is aimed at offering space for produce sales in farmer’s markets and produce stands at local schools and hospitals. The goal is to help local farmers have enough economic support that will allow them to stay in business and continue to sell their crops in the community. By striving to give local farmers more opportunities to succeed, Phat Beets hopes to lower the dependency residents have on cheap, processed food because there will be more options to buy local, nutritious food.

Phat Beets also makes it a point to connect “community and individual health with our food system.” They also aim to connect the community to food justice by focusing on groups that need aid, like residents suffering from obesity, and teaching them how to make healthy lifestyle decisions. In order to have a strong food system, programs like “Fresh Fellows” teach youth at risk of chronic diseases how to have a healthy lifestyle regardless of the challenges they face. Lastly, part of the Phat Beets strategy is to form community organizing like workshops and farmers’ markets, with the goal of fostering a sense of unity and strength so that the community can come together to fight the issues affecting them, like “those affected by diet related diseases within the North Oakland Flatlands."

Another way that they are also working to promote food justice and make healthy food more accessible is by creating new methods of allowing sustainable food to be in the economy. For example, Phat Beets has worked toward passing policies that would allow residents to utilize public parks for food cultivation, including collaboration with the Edible Parks Task Force to create gardens at public parks. Furthermore, Phat Beets previously connected with local entrepreneurs to help boost the local economy by participating in The Kitchen Incubator program to help give small restaurant businesses a stronger chance of being successful. This program is intended to help create a profitable economic environment for sustainable food.

=== Gentrification ===
Phat Beets has decided to take an open stance against gentrification, “a shift in an urban community toward wealthier residents and/or businesses and increasing property values”, because they believe they should fight intersecting social issues in order to allow food justice to thrive. Gentrification pushes residents out of their communities and makes it more difficult for them to have access to healthy, affordable food. So in order to strengthen food justice, Phat Beets believes it must also help fight gentrification. Phat Beets has stated that gentrification is the result of “a politically deliberate program set in motion by real estate companies, developers, big business, government officials and police.” Phat Beets believes one way gentrification could be alleviated would be if the City of Oakland provided monetary support for the community.

Phat Beets released a “Statement on Gentrification” to elaborate on their gentrification position. In summary it says that if someone agrees with Phat Beets’ mission, then they are ultimately against gentrification because it forces out residents and therefore prevents low-income minority groups from having access to healthy, affordable food. Phat Beets believes the City of Oakland contributes to the perpetuation of gentrification because it decreases monetary support for North Oakland residents, while it still “selectively funnels funds into better transportation and subsidizes high-end business and housing developments.” Phat Beets does not support documentaries made by the Better Homes and Real Estate Company that promote NOBE (an acronym that stands for North Oakland, Berkeley, and Emoryvile) that state “these neighborhoods are being ‘discovered’” because it is an attempt to make the neighborhood more attractive to richer residents and businesses. Phat Beets understands that new individuals moving into Oakland cannot be blamed for gentrification, but it is important to still understand the systems that are allowing for gentrification and other injustices to continue.

==== Urban gardens' contribution to gentrification ====
Urban gardens are generally created to make a positive contribution to their communities. However, some arguments have been made that urban gardens promote gentrification because they are placing their needs above those of the underrepresented groups in their community. Urban gardens could be used as a “gentrification tool” because their attractiveness might allure higher end businesses and richer residents to move into the area. This would help raise the cost of living and subsequently force the people that the community garden was attempting help out. Phat Beets stood by their belief when a local business, Grease Box, moved into their former farmer's market location, sparking public claims of displacement and gentrification from the organization toward the owner.

Some supporters of urban agriculture, like the San Francisco Urban Agriculture alliance oppose such arguments because they believe that there are larger social and economic forces at play that cause gentrification. Patrick Crouch, an urban farmer and author, also believes that gentrification is directly influenced by government’s economic incentives to bring in more affluent people, and is not caused by community development. There have been instances of some urban gardens, like Georgia Street in Detroit, that are thought to help the community but not contribute to gentrification because of their location. Georgia Street is located far from high traffic areas that would make it more alluring for businesses to open.

In order to better deal with the contribution of gentrification urban gardening may have, the San Franischo Urban Agriculture Alliance and Crouch's Urban Garden, like Phat Beets, have decided to incorporate social justice into their organizations framework in order to “make sure urban agriculture is more than just a catalyst for gentrification.” This would allow urban gardens to be a positive contribution to the community because they are keeping its issues and needs in mind. Patrick Crouch suggests that understanding the community’s history and policies, supporting community leaders, and paying attention to the people’s needs will allow an urban garden to help combat gentrification from occurring.

==== Stance on gentrification ====
One of the biggest platforms that Phat Beets Produce works on is gentrification as it relates to food justice. In fact, Phat Beets is one of the first organizations in the country to connect issues of food justice with gentrification, creating a model for other organizations around the country. Maurice, one of the founders had this to say about making those connections“A lot of organizations that have a lot more push and power are really interested by what we’re saying and they contact us from around the country. We’re influencing the way they do their work. We’re also pushing other organizations to start talking about these issues. We get to be the bad guys, we get to get shit on. But at the same time everyone else in the movement and in other movement have to move along with our rhetoric.” According to Phat Beets, gentrification is defined as, “When long time residents in low-income communities due to the migration of new more affluent residents and the rising housing costs associated with developments and businesses that cater to them.” Phat Beets Produce believes that gentrification has a huge potential to undermine their food justice work because it is displacing the low income colored communities that they are trying to give access to healthy foods. Phat Beets Produce also fears that gentrification could price their own organization out of the neighborhood because the rent prices in North Oakland, where they operate from, continue to increase. Phat Beets also highlights that gentrification is a structural rather than individual process and do not intend to criminalize their new neighbors. Although, gentrification has the potential to also help the organization, because new more affluent residents are moving into the area and giving them financial support, Phat Beets continues to fight gentrification in any way they can. One way they do so is by challenging the structures that encourages the movement of new more affluent families, such as certain economic and investment models.

==== Gentrification and Linette Edwards ====
In 2011, the foreclosure rate in Oakland was 1 out of 241 homes foreclosed, making Oakland’s foreclosure rates, one of the highest in California. These foreclosure rates and gentrification drive longtime residents out of their homes, an issue Phat Beets Produce makes a huge effort to fight. Phat Beets states that “Gentrification is a dynamic that emerges in poor urban areas when renovation, restoration, and residential shifts drives people out of the neighborhood.” One of the tactics used by Phat Beets is to address this issue of gentrification in Oakland with local realtors such as Linette Edwards. Realtors like Linette promote areas like Oakland through the term NOBE (North Oakland, Berkeley, and Emeryville) as an up-and-coming community, with new restaurants, walkability, and easy access to San Francisco. However, these new businesses according to Phat Beets are only increasing the appeal of higher income migrants and decreasing accessibility of those same resources to the poor. While promoting the development of the community may be seemingly good, Phat Beets understands this as a threat to the longtime members of the community. For example, new businesses can afford increased commercial rent and can cater to a more affluent base of consumers, displacing old businesses, and decreasing accessibility to those who can't afford these new businesses. This new revitalization of the area, with new bars and cafes, is not always seen as friendly to longtime residents as new high-income residents are actually pushing them out through foreclosure, according to Phat Beets. Even more problematic, to Phat Beets Produce, realtors like Linette are using their gardens and markets as well as other neighborhood gardens to flip homes and further gentrify the neighborhood.

==== Gentrification and Grease Box ====
One of the most recent challenges has been displacement by other organizations. The once abandoned North Oakland building was supposed to open a healthy foods cafe to provide access to fresh food options to a community who otherwise did not have access to it. Phat Beets had also just opened up a Kitchen Incubator program that allowed low income Oakland residents to open up their own food business at a low price. However, when a new tenant arrived in 2013, Grease Box (A gluten free restaurant) things became problematic for the program. What was supposed to be a harmonious relationship, with Phat Beets Produce’s farmers market operating in the parking lot turned out to be very problematic according to Phat Beets. Just months after Grease Box moved into the building Phat Beets accused the owner of displacing not only its own programs but also low income Oakland residents in the process of gentrification. In a statement describing the situation Phat Beets commented that Grease Box is “part of the ongoing process of gentrification where historic Oakland residents lose houses, jobs, and opportunities to newer, wealthier incoming residents with greater access to resources.” According to Phat Beets, for these reasons, GreaseBox has shut down the Kitchen Incubator Program and has forced them to move locations to the Arlington Health Center.

==== Gentrification and the community ====
According to Phat Beets Produce the problem is that Grease Box is not just a threat to them, but it is a threat to the community overall. Phat Beets Produce has complained that many of the vendors in the Kitchen Incubator program have not been able to use the kitchen because of Grease Box’s owner’s Lizzy’s demand for a gluten free kitchen and health permits only allowing Grease Box employees to use the kitchen. Other vendors such as the one owned by Naimah Matthews have been displaced and were forced to pack their stuff and leave once Grease Box moved in, even though they had been cooking and selling food out of the cafe before Grease Box had even arrived. Phat Beets thinks this is also problematic for the community because historic residents are now being forced to move because their housing costs and property values are rising with new residents and businesses like Grease Box moving in. This has caused Phat Beets to spend their time, money, and resources to fight displacement instead of focusing on their food justice programs.

== Organization of the collective ==
The basic leadership structure of Phat Beets Produce is highly dependent on the work of volunteers. The main five programs that Phat Beets Produce has are the farmers’ markets, Healthy Hearts Youth Empowerment, Beet Box Urban Community Sustained Agriculture, Get Organized! and Community Celebrates!. Currently, the main source of leadership and organization is the volunteer collective that consists of 8–12 members. Each member has to meet certain requirements to fulfill membership, including a 1-year commitment, participation in 80% of monthly meetings, and volunteering 4 hours every month. They also use a working group based model where different working committees are responsible for creating and leading their own program. Currently there are five committees: the Farmer’s Market Committee, Garden Steering Committee, CSA committee, and the Fundraising Committee. The current main leaders of the collective are Max Cadji, Brett Benner, and Toveo Hill.

=== Farmers' market and produce stands ===
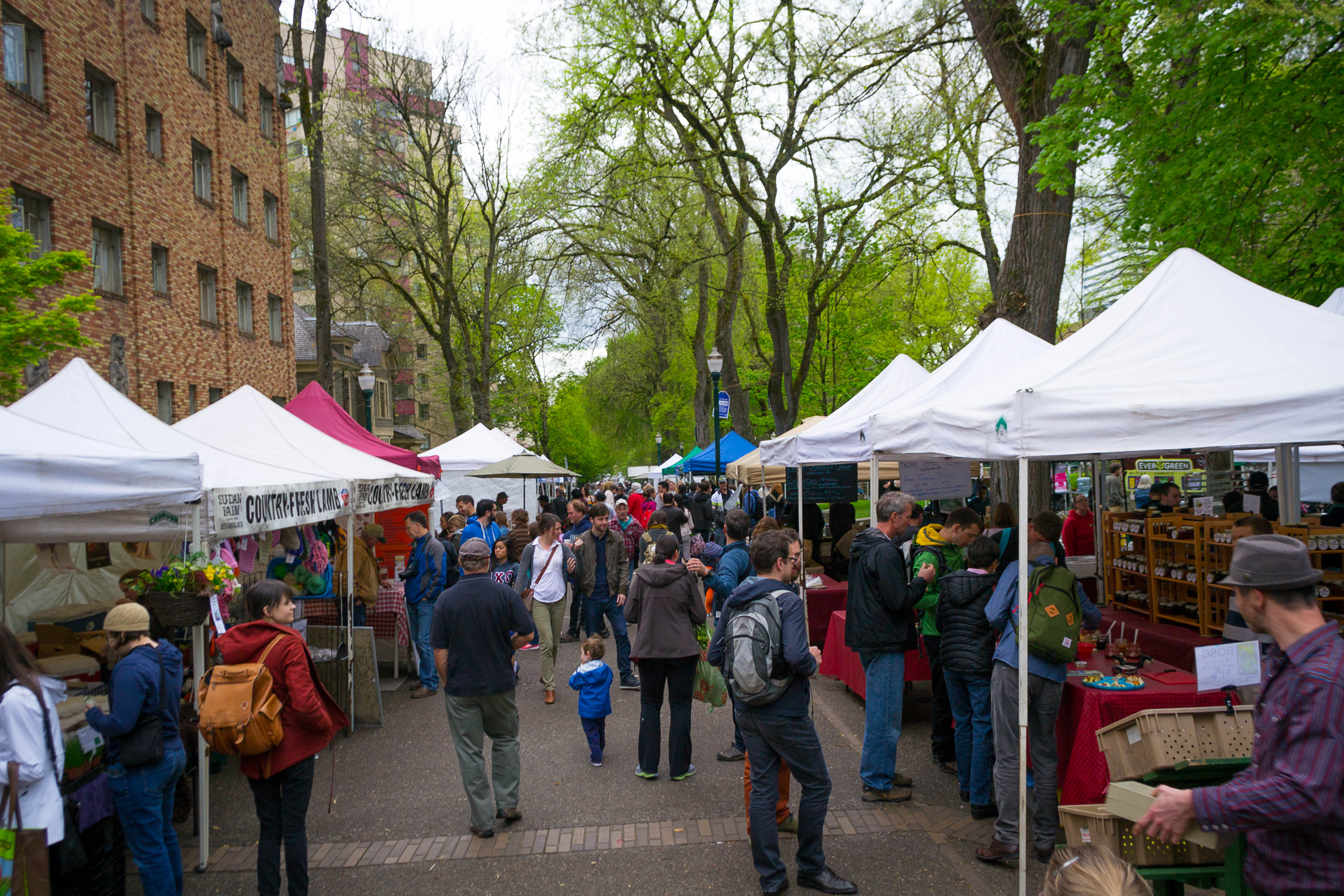
Farmers' Market

A major component of urban agriculture is actually getting the produce to the local residents. Besides beet boxes, farmers markets are the main source of this exchange in the community. Phat Beet Produce has two farmers’ markets in clinics and two community produce stands. The 4 different farmers markets located in: North Arlington Medical Center, North Oakland Children’s Hospital, Farm Free Stand – Arlington Medical Center, and Saint Martin De Porres Community Produce Stand. The produce that is sold at these farmers’ markets comes primarily from small farmers and farmers of color. At the farmers’ markets, there are also vendors that sell already cooked food. In terms of future expansion, Phat Beets Produce plans to open a new farmer's market on June 14 of 2014. The location of this new farmers' market will be near the Destiny Arts Center in North Oakland.

Will Scott, the President of the African American Farmer’s of California is one of the many farms that participate in the farmers’ markets. Even though the Scott’s Family Farm is based in Fresno, Will Scott makes the trip to Oakland in order to increase presence of farmers of color in our nation. One commentator in “The Disappearing Farmer” stated that there is, “loss of land by our farmers, African American farmers, who are now less than 2% in the country, and have been losing about a half million acres of land a year in this country. And there were some indicators that for every acre lost, there was a reciprocal loss of economic wealth in our community.” African-American history of agriculture in the United States is an important driving force for present-day farmers of color. Furthermore, throughout history, there has been a correlation between land ownership and power.

==== St. Martin De Porres ====
Phat Beets was first started by Max Cadjii and Brett Brenner in 2007 at the St. Martin de Porres School, located at the school parking lot on 675 41st Street in Oakland. OBUGS, a garden organization partnered with Phat Beets to create a garden and produce stand that would make healthy food more accessible to children and residents. This produce stand is still available to students, so instead of kids rushing to the ice cream truck, they have various fresh and healthy produce they can choose from. Every Wednesday from September to June, Phat Beets comes to the school and supplies the children with fresh produce. To help the children develop leadership roles, the children help set up, prepare the vegetables, handle transactions, and are a part of food demonstrations. This is effective in helping teach the youth more about food justice.

==== Oakland’s Children’s Hospital ====
The Oakland’s Children Hospital Farmer’s Market was started by Max Cadji, Dr. Jennifer Matthews, and Brett Brenner in June 2010. Max Cadji wanted to open up a new produce market and was able to collaborate with Dr. Jennifer Mathews to create a produce stand in the hospital. This idea met the goals of Phat Beets by increasing healthy food accessibility to residents and of Dr. Mathews because it directly supports the patients of the Healthy Hearts Clinic, a child obesity clinic. Dr. Mathews realized that it was important to create a produce stand when she witnessed how difficult it was for her Healthy Hearts patients to buy the fruits and vegetable she prescribed because they were too expensive or far away.

The Oakland’s Children Hospital farmer’s market aim is to offer an extensive variety of fruits, vegetables, plants, seeds, and other treats as cheaply possible. To make the produce as affordable as possible they offer $5 food vouchers (“carrot cash”) and accept food stamps in order to help get people more interested in exploring healthy food. Its location is also convenient because patients have to walk through the farmer’s market as they leave the hospital. Furthermore, the farmer’s market is on the same day as the Healthy Hearts Clinic, a pediatric program dedicated to preventing and treating childhood diet-related illnesses, so that the patients are more likely to visit the produce stand. This farmer’s market and Dover garden now offer a Healthy Hearts Youth Garden in partnership with the Healthy Hearts Clinic.

==== North Oakland Arlington Center ====
On July 3, 2010, Phat beets opened a new farmers market in the parking lot of Arlington Medical Center (on 57th and Market Streets) in collaboration with North Oakland Pediatrics to offer their community healthy food and resources. They ensure their produce is affordable food by keeping prices “low and having all vendors accept WIC vouchers.” Besides providing healthy, affordable food, there is also entertainment like live music, face painting; and educational components like health, anti-police brutality workshops and free cooking demos.

Phat Beets moved the North Oakland Arlington Center in June 2013 to 942 Stanford Avenue, at Lowell Street, to occupy an abandoned building at the corner of Stanford and Lowell. The building provided a "unique opportunity to expand the market, and to hold it at a visible space" and was intended to serve as a community gathering area. The farmers market offers a healthy café and a kitchen intended to function as a "business incubator" for food entrepreneurs (see the Community Healthy Food Business Incubator Kitchen Program section). The kitchen is intended to support the local economy by providing disadvantaged residents with opportunities to establish their own businesses.

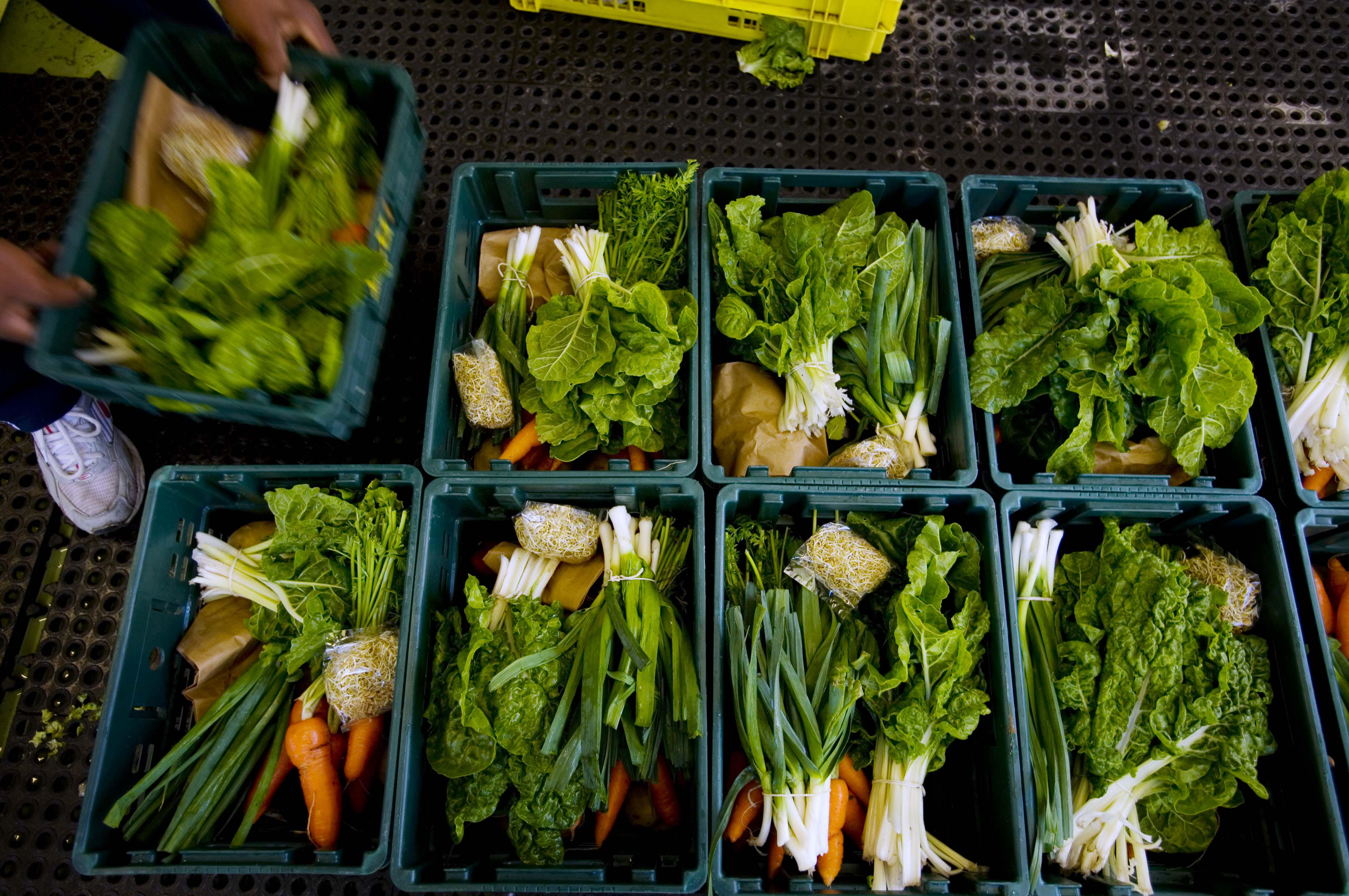
Example of a CSA box

=== Beet Boxes ===
Beet Boxes are boxes that are packed with 11 to 14 organic and pesticide-free fruits and vegetables that were locally grown by small farmers. Small farmers are those whose farms do not exceed 40 acres in land. Local residents can purchase and pick up these boxes at one of Phat Beets Produce’s locations in Oakland. The Beet Boxes reflect the “Community Supported Agriculture” model. Community supported agriculture is an alternative economic model to increase self-sustainability and just food distribution in the community while improving the environment. The increased demand of Beet Boxes is a reflection of the growing interest in urban gardening and food justice in Oakland. According to the Urban Food Systems Coordinator, Max Cadji in 2013, “We started the Beet Box two years ago with five members and we now have we over 250 active members with about 125 boxes being delivered each week.” As of 2014, Phat Beets Produce delivers up to 180 Beet Boxes every week. On their website, Phat Beets Produce updates the different types of foods that will be in each Beet Box for that week. This community supported agriculture model is beneficial to both the farmers and the consumers. The farmers are able to earn money from their crops early in the season, which is important for maintaining a positive cash flows. Consumers benefit by obtaining fresh ingredients that are in season and become exposed to a wider variety of foods through the process. Some other community supported agriculture organizations in the East Bay include: Eatwell Farm, Eat Outside the Box, Farm Fresh To You, Full Belly Farm, Happy Child CSA, and Marin Sun Farms.

=== Community programs ===
==== Healthy Hearts Youth Garden ====
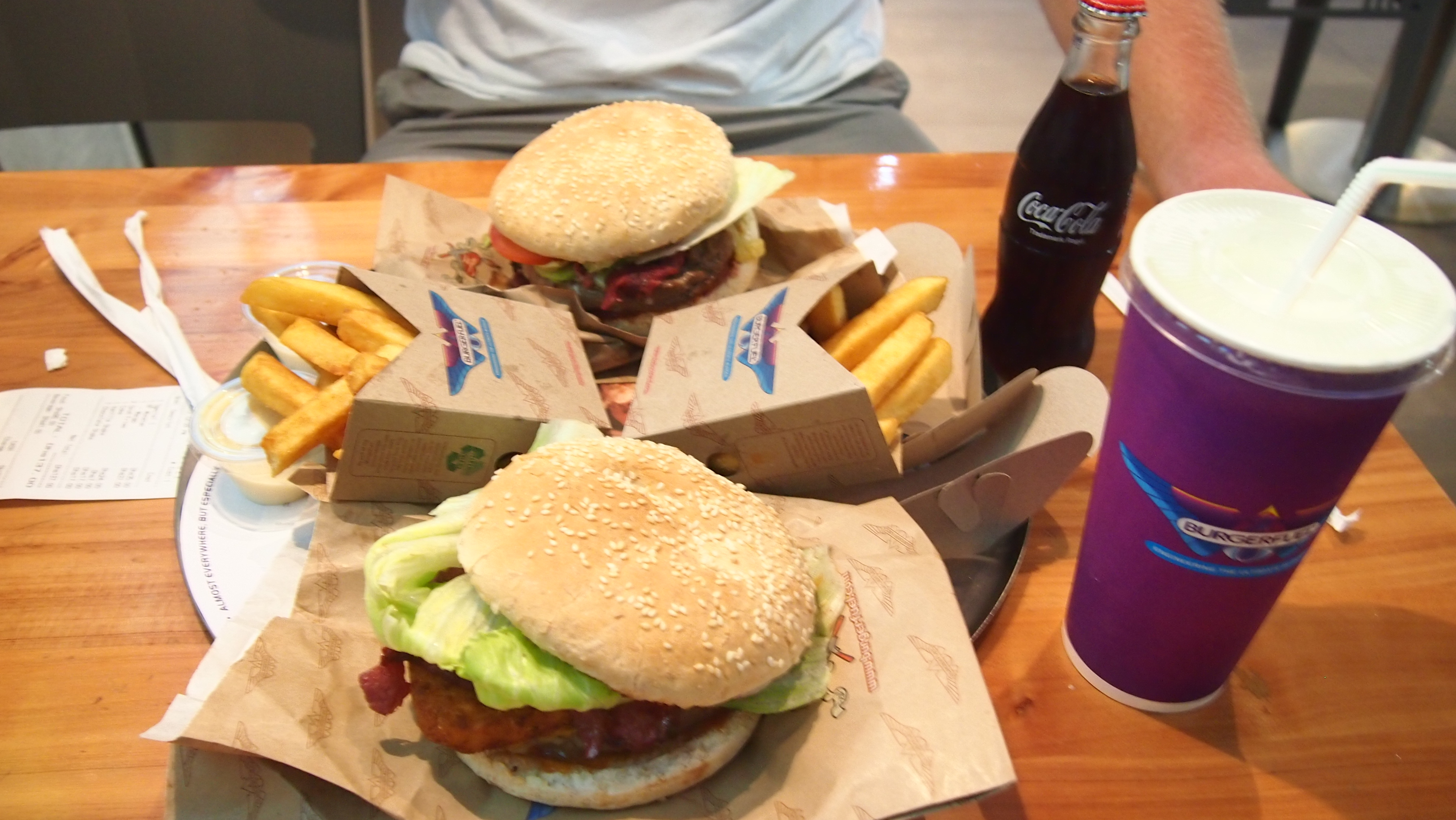
Junk Food

In 2009, Phat Beets Produce partnered up with the Children’s Hospital in Oakland to create an obesity prevention program for Oakland youth. Obesity is a growing health problem in urban communities where opportunity to exercise and access to healthy food is limited. According to a study conducted by Rice University in 2012, children that live in poorer communities are 30% more likely to become obese than their counterparts in wealthy neighborhoods. Some of the risk factors that contribute to childhood obesity include the prevalence of sugary and processed foods, television advertisements and media portrayal of fast foods, unsafe neighborhoods that discourage exercise, and lack of breastfeeding. Overall, a combination of lack of exercise and a poor diet leads to severe consequences in terms of this burden of chronic disease. Another important issue in urban communities like Oakland is the development and growth of food deserts in these regions. A food desert is an urban neighborhood without access to affordable and healthy foods. Hence, the residents only have fast food or convenience stores to fulfill their nutritional needs. Continued consumption of low-nutrition food contributes to a greater prevalence of obesity, heart disease, and diabetes. According to the Economic Research Service from the USDA, there are 23.5 million people who currently live in food deserts. A disproportionate amount of these residents are low-income and under-resourced citizens. According to the USDA, the official definition of a food desert is “census tract with a substantial share of residents who live in low-income areas that have low levels of access to a grocery store or healthy, affordable food retail outlet.” Low-income is a “poverty rate of 20 percent or greater or a median family income at or below 80 percent of the area median family income.” Low-access means that “500 people or 33% or of the tract population live more than a mile away from a grocery store.” The Federal government is working to reduce the number of food deserts in the United States. The 2011 budget included $150 million in private and public investments for programs that will promote healthy food alternatives in food deserts.

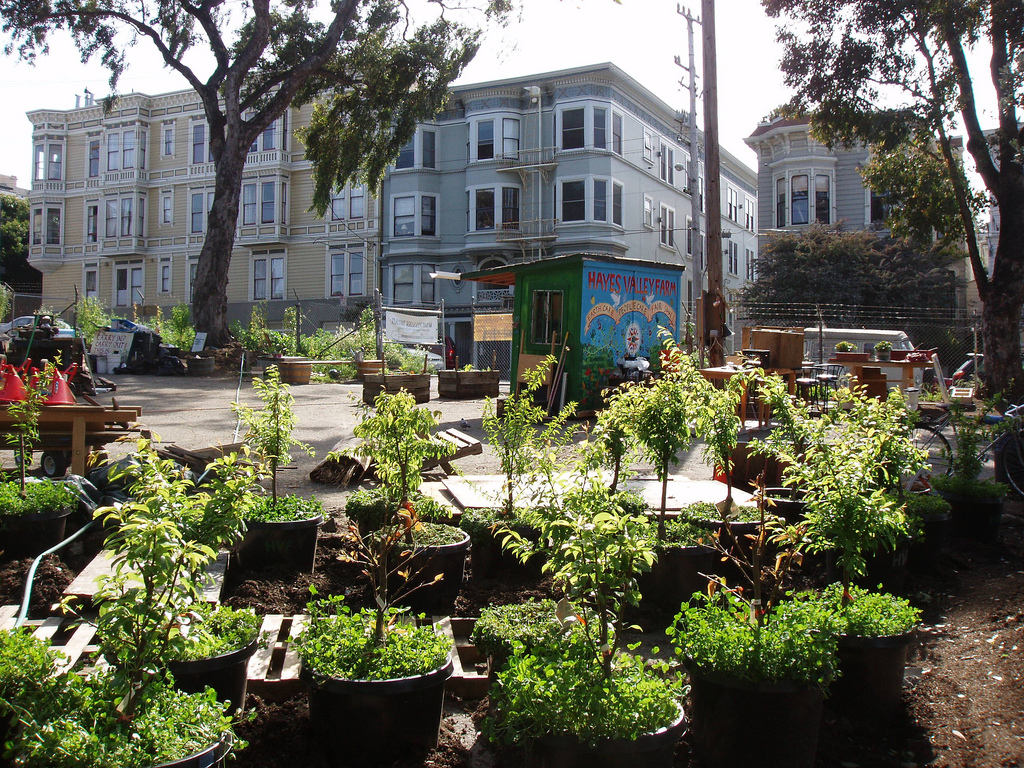
Urban Gardening

In order to combat the growing obesity problem and reduce food deserts, the Healthy Hearts Youth Empowerment program promotes healthy living practices by teaching youth how to create their own urban garden, grow their own food, and change their diets to improve overall health. The youth in the program are encouraged to learn how to cook by themselves and make conscious and healthy choices when selecting food for consumption. The underlying idea behind this program is to promote health education among the youth. By promoting a healthy eating lifestyle, the program hopes that the participants will be able to bring what they learned back to their own family and community. Each cycle of this program consists of a group of 8–12 students. In terms of community gardening, they have transformed the 1/4-acre plot (approximately 10,000 sq. ft) in Dover Street Park into arable land. This urban garden has produced over 3000 pounds of produce every year. The produce is sold to local residents in the community through the Phat Beet Produce’s clinic based farm stands. In addition, this partnership has a “Fresh Fellows” food justice program that specifically targets teenagers who are at risk of heart disease and Type 2 diabetes. The “Fresh Fellows” program is dedicated to teaching the teenagers to be leaders in the food justice system. Over the years, this program has trained over 60 youth leaders. One of the participants in the 2011 summer session stated “Well I’m going to bring to my community to more gardens, activities with more peers, more hands on gardening activities because we don’t have enough of that. But I feel like I would take basically everything I learned here to my community and my family because I feel like if I could benefit from it then someone else can benefit from it. ” Urban gardening is positively correlated with health benefits in the community. Residents are more willing to eat the food they grow, benefit from the exercise of tending to gardens, and feel safe and involved in their community.

There is a growing trend of converting urban land into gardens or community space. In Richmond, the Richmond Greenway Project has transformed previously unused railroad land into a bicycle and pedestrian-safe community with plenty of open space. The purpose of this project is to provide residents easy access to the outdoors while promoting healthy exercising activities like bicycling. The land that was once occupied by the Atchison-Topeka and Santa Fe railroad has now been transformed into 3 miles of biking and walking trails, and over 32 acres of open space. Hospitals, like Kaiser Permanente, are trying to integrate nature into their facilities. At the Oakland Medical Center branch, they have created a Serenity Garden that displays many plants native to the community, with the hope that the increase in nature will be beneficial and therapeutive to patients.

==== Phat Beetz Pickle Company ====
In 2014, Phat Beets Produce added another youth program focused on entrepreneurship and gaining work experience. The Phat Beetz Pickle Company is a joint cooperation between the “Fresh Fellows” and the Kitchen Incubator program. This pilot program goes toward developing the work skills of Oakland youth by providing job employment opportunities through the production and sales of pickles and jams. The pickles and jams are sold online, at local cafes, and at the Phat Beets’ farmers market. The goal is to make enough money through sales to fund the participants and the youth company. Furthermore, this program helps generate a source of finance for the participants and acts as a stepping stone to future employment opportunities. The goal is to make enough money with pickle company to fund youth.

==== Community Healthy Food Business Incubator Kitchen Program ====
In the spring of 2013, Phat Beets Produce launched the Community Healthy Food Business Incubator Kitchen Program to support local low-income vendors. With the support of the Alameda County Health Department, the collaboration aims to help local vendors and residents successfully start up their own business. It is specifically built to help people of color, the economically disadvantaged, and the under-resourced. The financial component of this project gives business one year’s worth of subsidized resources – including liability insurance, food safety training, kitchen equipment, lease space, and workshops focusing on financial literacy. The long-term goal of this program is to develop a strong marketing cooperative and community. In addition, the program tests out the implementation of the Cottage Food Bill that was enacted in January 2013. The Cottage Food Bill allows small business owners to produce certain non-perishable foods in home kitchens once they acquire a permit. Hence, small vendors would not have to rent or lease a place to sell their food. This would greatly reduce the start-up capital needed to create an entrepreneurship or small business. Vendors would be able to invest this capital into other areas of their business that lack funding. Ever since the bill passed in 2013, 1000 microbusinesses have developed to take advantage of this policy. However, one of the criticisms of this bill is the different permit fees based on location. For example, if one lived in Santa Clara Class A permits are $219 annually and Class B permits are $635, whereas in Alameda, Class A permits cost $162 and Class B permits cost $243. Class A permits allow businesses to directly sell to customers and Class B permits allow sales through a third party—a store or retailer. These differences in fee costs provide obstacles for small business owners to navigate through the system.

The primary purpose of the food business incubator kitchen program is to support small businesses and reinvest resources back into the local community. A major barrier for small vendors is the lack of capital resources and business knowledge. Hence, this program aims to provide support for first time entrepreneurs in the community. In the long term, the idea is that if more business and employment is created in the area, the community would be self-sustainable without interference from outside big businesses. As a result, there would be no need for residents to move out of the area.

== Historical influence ==
Phat Beets position on social issues stems in large part from the civil rights movement and political groups such as The Black Panther Party. Phat Beets incorporates the fundamental ideas of these movements and organizations into their own mission, such as the right to have equal access to food and education. The Black Panther’s Free Breakfast for Children Program is similar to Phat Beet’s farmer’s markets because they share the value that a community must have healthy and nutritious diets in order to perform at their best to improve their communities. Furthermore, The Black Panther Party, like Phat Beets, believes that “anti-hunger efforts and food-centered campaigns were driven by an implicit understanding of the power of food in battles over racialized definitions of personhood, a forum for both enforcing and resisting hegemonic authority.” In other words, these organizations believe that food programs are essential to battling unjust social conditions. Phat Beets continues to promote on food justice notions by providing workshops, like Food N’Justice workshops, to explain how health and food can be used as opportunities for social change.

== Similar organizations ==
ALBA (Agriculture Based Training Association), The People’s Grocery, OBUGS, St.Martin De Porress Elementary, The Healthy Hearts Clinic at the Children’s Hospital Oakland, Arlington Medical Center, The Dover St Neighborhood Group, Oakland Local.

=== North Oakland Restorative Justice Alliance ===
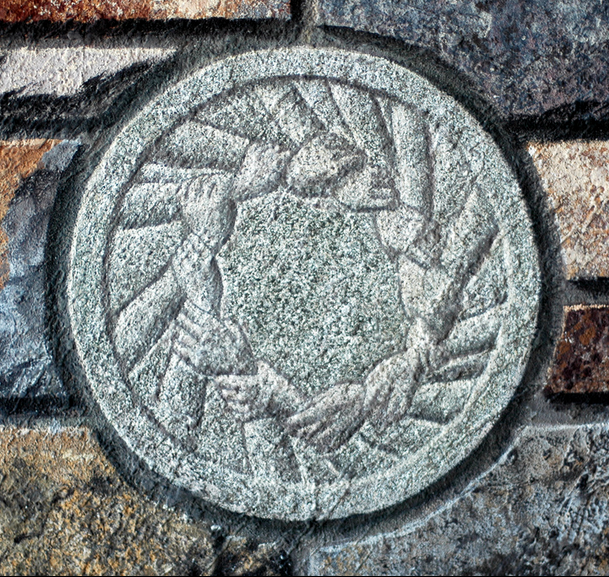
Image depicting restorative justice

The North Oakland Restorative Justice Alliance or council is made up of many different community organizations such as Bethany Baptist Church, the Bay Area Youth empowerment project and Phat Beets Produce. Phat Beets Produce and others suggest that the fight for food justice is beyond just giving access to fresh fruits and vegetables for people who would not otherwise have it. It is about making the community a safer place overall, where people can thrive and live their lives to the fullest extent. Therefore, the North Oakland Restorative justice council was founded to help the community deal and challenge both institutional and interpersonal violence. Their main goals are to promote urban gardening and greening, anti-displacement projects, campaigning, and promoting community safety with economic development, through the process of restorative justice. Restorative justice is a collective reaction to an offense in which the community or the groups of people involved get together to figure out what to do as a response, as well as figuring out the implications for the future. Restorative justice is centered around both rehabilitating the victim and the offender but also not criminalizing the wrongdoer and try to integrate them back into the community while simultaneously making them responsible for their actions. Some specific actions Phat Beets is taking to meet these restorative justice goals are creating programs for youth in which they can practice art and food production in public spaces and hosting restorative justice circles to help mitigate neighborhood crime and help colored communities who face displacement and racial profiling.

== Intersectional analysis ==
Phat Beets understands problems in the community to be cyclical and highlights the connection of how food issues can affect housing through structural racism or gentrification. Dealing with community safety for Phat Beets Produce also means making sure that police are not racially profiling their members and their community. Maurice, one of the founders of the organization had this to say about the interconnectedness of food justice issues to much larger issues. “We’re not about just food justice. Food justice is our platform because we’re passionate about food. But anti-violence and restorative justice are just as important as food justice. As is racial, economic, and housing justice. Without an intersectional analysis, the organization cannot adequately address the intersectional nature of food injustice.”. Thus, Phat Beets strives to make connections between all of the inequality that may exist in the community as they see it all ties back to food justice issues.

== Ken Shandy and health disparities in Oakland ==
The leading cause of death for men in Oakland is heart disease and for African American men like Ken Shandy, they are 20 times more likely to suffer from heart disease than white males. This accounts for the largest proportion of inequality in life expectancy between whites and blacks. That is because African American men are more vulnerable to social conditions that lead to heart disease such as lack of access to healthy food, lack of safe green space to exercise, and hypertension, among other environmental factors. This lack access to healthy food, is one of the main causes for diet-related diseases in low income communities of color, some of these conditions include type II diabetes, heart disease, various forms of cancers and other preventable diseases. In low income areas diets that are affordable and accessible are generally high in refined grains, added grains, and added fats which might fill up someone’s stomach for a short time but are extremely nutrient poor, often leading to higher risk of disease and higher mortality. These nutrient poor diets have also been an independent predictor in many studies of obesity and metabolic syndrome.

== Ken Shandy and Phat Beets ==
Phat Beets believes that these diets are not being consumed by choice, and that physical proximity to healthy food choices is a huge indicator in diet quality. In other words, the better access one has to supermarkets the more one will consume fresh fruits and vegetables. One of the ways Phat Beets attempts to combat these diet-related diseases is through food justice work, for example by coordinating the creation of produce stands and farmers markets to make fresh fruits and vegetables more easily accessible to historically marginalized groups. Ken Shandy, a longtime North Oakland resident, is the perfect example of how Phat Beets Produce aims to change lives. Ken Shandy suffers from heart disease and is working with SOS juice, Farms to Grow, and Phat Beets Produce to gain access to knowledge about food, how to live a healthy life, and gain access to fresh fruits and vegetables. His goal is to lose 250 pounds to better his life and the life of his son. To achieve his goal he is boycotting fast foods, juicing daily, and installing a 5,000 sq ft organic produce garden in an empty lot next to his house. With the help of Phat Beets Produce he is also receiving a weekly produce beet box each week for the next year to supplement his juicing from the garden. Ken is an example of a person in the community that would otherwise not be able to afford or have access to a health lifestyle. Ken not only seeks to change his life and his family’s through this project but also wishes to set an example to help prevent diet-related illness in his community. Most community members cannot afford organic produce and must resort to dangerous diets that include high fructose corn syrup and soy. Phat Beets attempts to assist its members to change their lifestyles and help get rid of high diet-related illness in the community, through urban organic gardening.

== Decolonize your Diet ==
One of Phat Beets Produce’s prized programs is Decolonize your diet. This program strives to liberate community members and helps people claim back their culture through food. Decolonize your diet was first started on what they call, indigenous day, which is an alternative to Columbus Day as it counters the narrative of Christopher Columbus discovering the new world and bringing civilization to it. Phat Beets tries to encourage people in the community to go back to their roots and learn about what has happened throughout the history of colonization and how it has been manifested in their diets. Decolonizing your diet addresses the issue of food justice in how poor people and people of color are poisoned by the foods that are accessible to them. In addition, Phat Beets calls for a further analysis of food justice overall that in order to understand such phenomena as “food deserts,” and unequal health outcomes in low income communities of color their needs to be a focus and understanding of how and why this came to be. Phat Beets stresses that this can be achieved through studying histories of institutionalized racism and disinvestment from low income communities of color.

== Community action ==
The organization does most of its urban gardening at Dover Park Garden, which is known as one of the country’s first and only city parks that have been transformed into an edible garden. This garden is connected to the Healthy Hearts Clinic 7. This is because at the children’s hospital or Arlington Medical center, where the clinic is located doctors often prescribe diets of fruits and vegetables for patients with diet-related illnesses who either can't afford it, or do not have physical access to it. To make sure that at risk youth can have access to fresh produce, Phat Beets Produce has a program called “Beet Bux,” that provides free vouchers for these patients. The “Beet Bux,” are subsidized by the communities’ purchases of CSA boxes. In addition, Phat Beets Produce provides other access to free produce for those who cannot afford it. However, it's not just about giving food away, Phat Beets produce makes it a point that along with giving away free food they also must achieve economic empowerment within the community so residents can afford their own produce or learn how to grow their own produce themselves. Using the Black Panther Party's free breakfast for school children program as a model, Phat Beets produce gives away produce at the medical center once a week. The Black Panther Party is a grassroots organization that has been known to combat violence and poverty in the African American community and is an organization that influences Phat Beets to do their work. Using one of the Black Panther Party's principles, Phat Beets gives away this produce with the understanding that individuals in the community, “cannot achieve their fullest potential for self determination and revolution without first eating a healthy meal.”

== Difficulties within the organization ==
One of the biggest problems for Phat Beets, as with any small non profit organization is funding. Many of its programs are underfunded and under resourced from the very beginning, but somehow they are able to make things work with the support of the community. Another major issue is Phat Beets Produce’s rhetoric and how they talk about certain issues that can sometimes make their neighbors uncomfortable. This is because Phat Beets addresses some serious and controversial issues in our country such as issues based on race. While speaking of these types of issues has brought trust with organizations combating issues of race, their critique on the state of the country and its race relations has turned away some of its liberal supporters, as it is often politically charged. This has led to upsetting and alienating some of its original supporters which has the potential to limit their financial base and stunt their relationships with their neighbors. Phat Beets produce has received many angry emails and letters, and even cancellations of their CSA boxes due to their controversial stance on some issues such as gentrification. Some of the complaints mentioned that Phat Beets was becoming divisive when it came to issues on gentrification and was accusing rather than uniting the community, due to its extremely politically charged rhetoric. However, Phat Beets still believes that although they could be threatening their financial support not speaking about these controversial issues that low income communities of colors face everyday would be even more dangerous. They believe that even if the organization loses its funding, what's more important to them is that they opened up the conversation in another direction and made people see another side of the issue.

== See also ==
- List of food cooperatives
