= Center for Agroecology & Sustainable Food Systems =

Agriculture research center

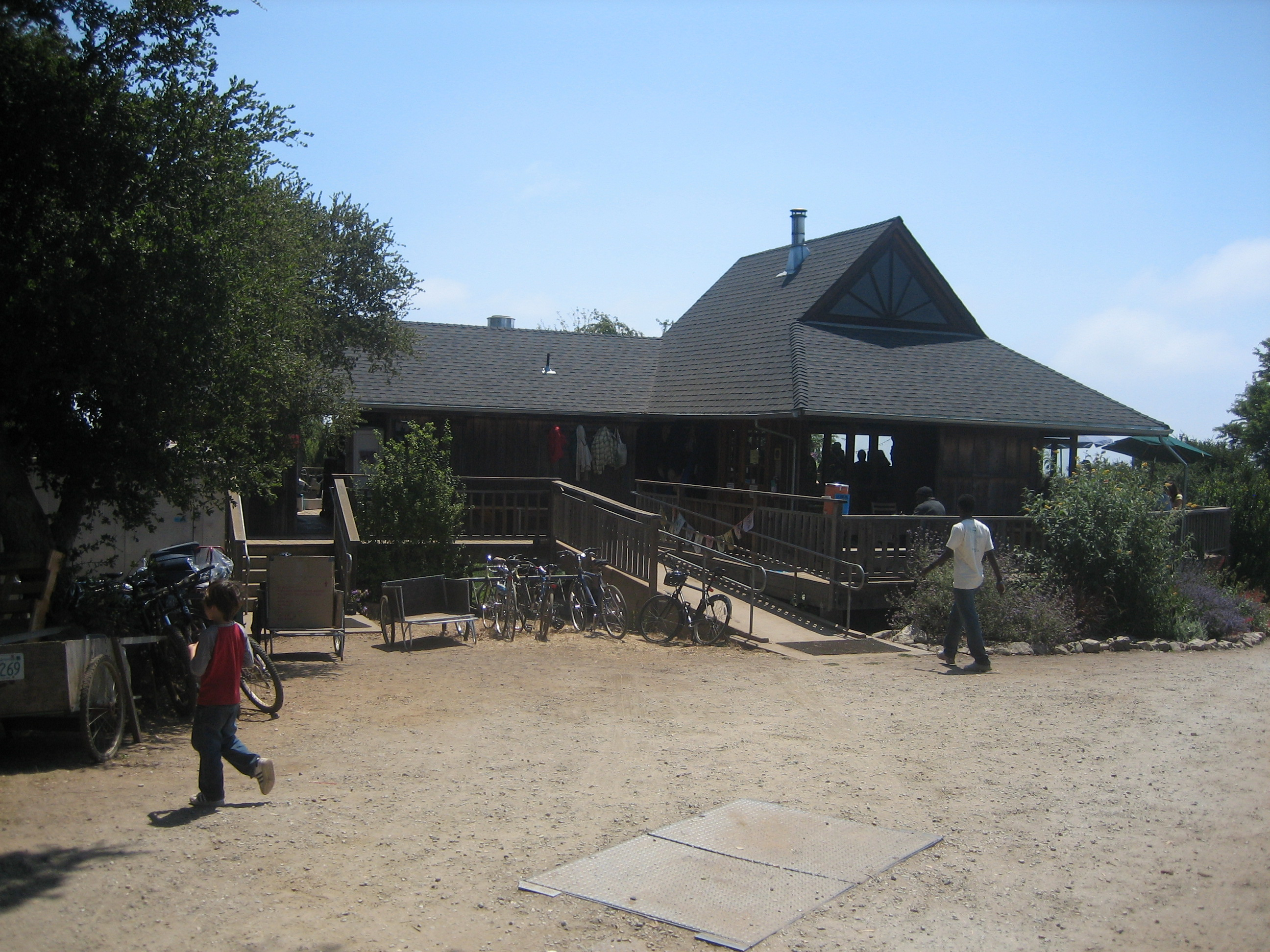
Communal kitchen on UCSC's farm

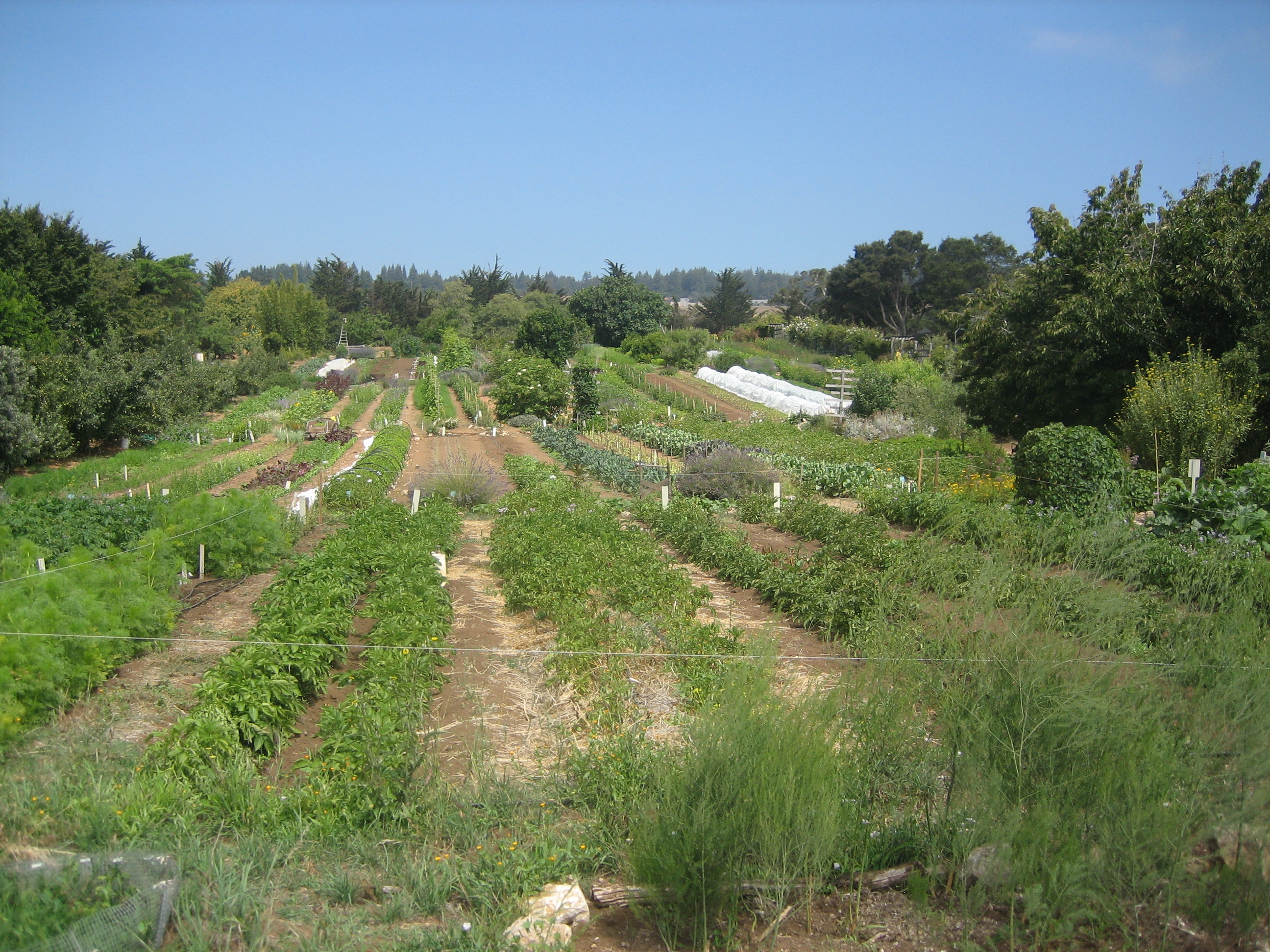
UCSC's organic farm

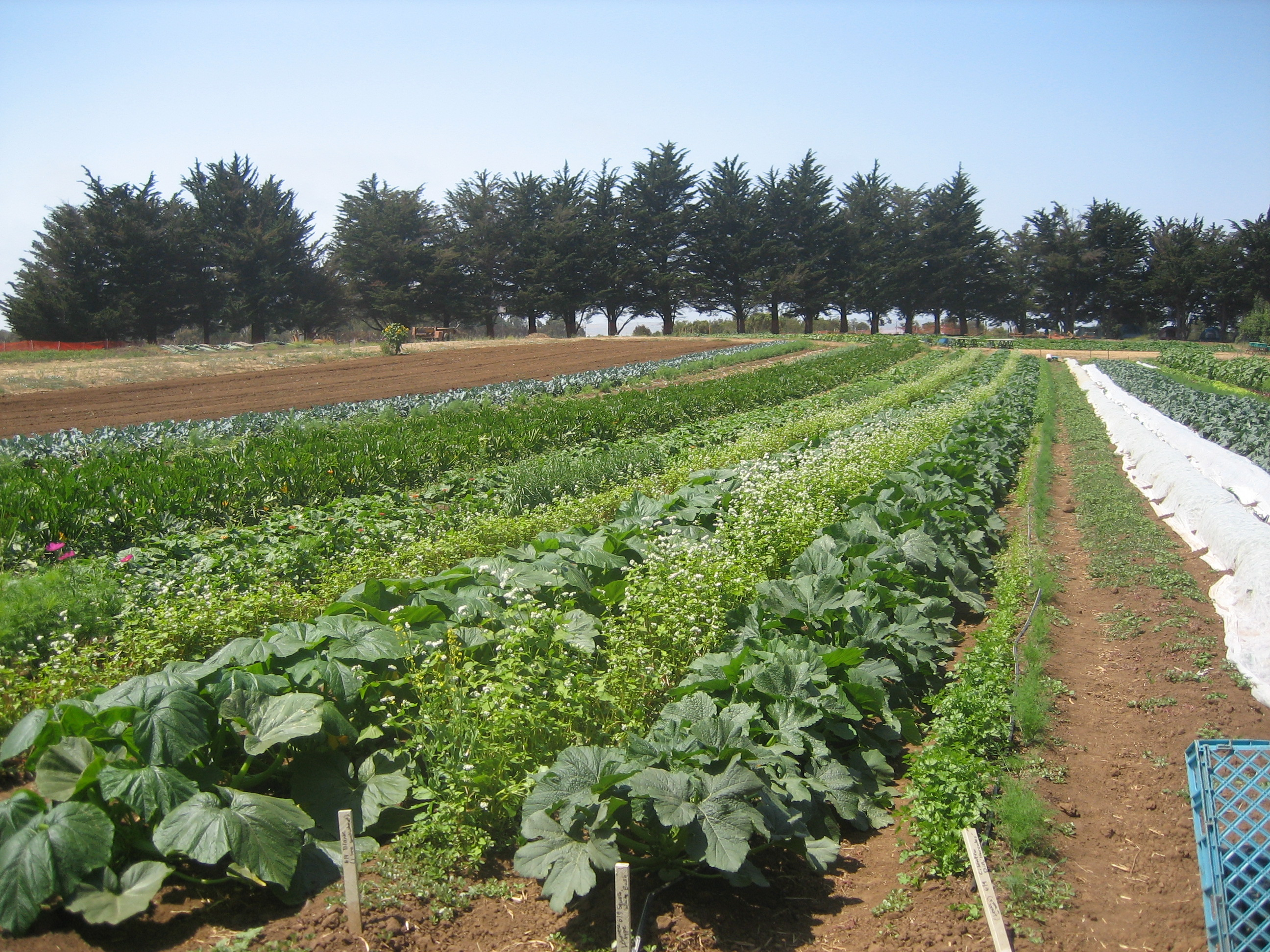
UCSC farm rows

The UC Santa Cruz Center for Agroecology (formerly the Center for Agroecology & Sustainable Food Systems) is a research, education, and public service organization within the Division of Social Sciences at the University of California, Santa Cruz.

The center's history dates back to 1967 when the university hired Alan Chadwick to lead the creation of a Student Garden Project (now the Alan Chadwick Garden) on its new campus. The center manages the 3-acre garden and a 30-acre farm located at the base of the UCSC campus.

The center is known for its Apprenticeship Program which provides training in the concepts and practices of organic gardening and small-scale farming. Other programs offered include undergraduate internships, on-farm research, farm tours, gardening workshops, and working to address student food insecurity.
