= Fresh (2009 film) =

FRESH
- Directed by: Ana Sofia Joanes
- Produced by: Ana Sofia Joanes
- Starring: Joel Salatin; Will Allen; Michael Pollan; John Ikerd; George Naylor; Diana Endicott; David Ball; Russ Kremer; Mr. & Mrs. Fox
- Edited by: Mona Davis
- Distributed by: The Video Project
- Release date: May 2009
- Running time: 72 minutes
- Country: United States
- Language: English

Fresh is a 2009 documentary film directed by Ana Sofia Joanes. The film focuses on sustainable agriculture, and depicts farmers, activists and entrepreneurs who are changing America's food system.

== Synopsis ==
Joanes sets out to profile people who are breaking away from conventional models of agriculture and food production. In the Shenandoah Valley of Virginia, Joel Salatin explains how he keeps his cows, chickens, pigs and natural grasses flourishing without using artificial fertilizers by closing the nutrient cycle. At Growing Power farm in Milwaukee, we meet Will Allen, who is turning three acres of industrial wasteland into nourishing farmland for his neighborhood. In Kansas City, David Ball breaks away from the standard concept of a supermarket by stocking his stores with produce from a cooperative of local farmers.

== Reception ==
=== Critical response ===
Jeannette Catsoulis of The New York Times noted that the film "casts a sympathetic eye on farmers under contract to the giants of agribusiness," and is "less judgmental" and "more folksy in tone than the recent Food, Inc.." Mark Feeney of the Boston Globe wrote, "Fresh may be righteous (as well as right), but it’s not unrealistic," and noted that "not once in the course of the movie is the word 'locavore' used."

=== Awards ===
==== Official Selection ====
- 2009 Environmental Film Festival
- 2009 Newport Beach Film Festival
- 2009 Maine International Film Festival
- 2009 Kerry Film Festival
