= The Solar Garden =

Coordinates: 32.5234°N 34.9448°E

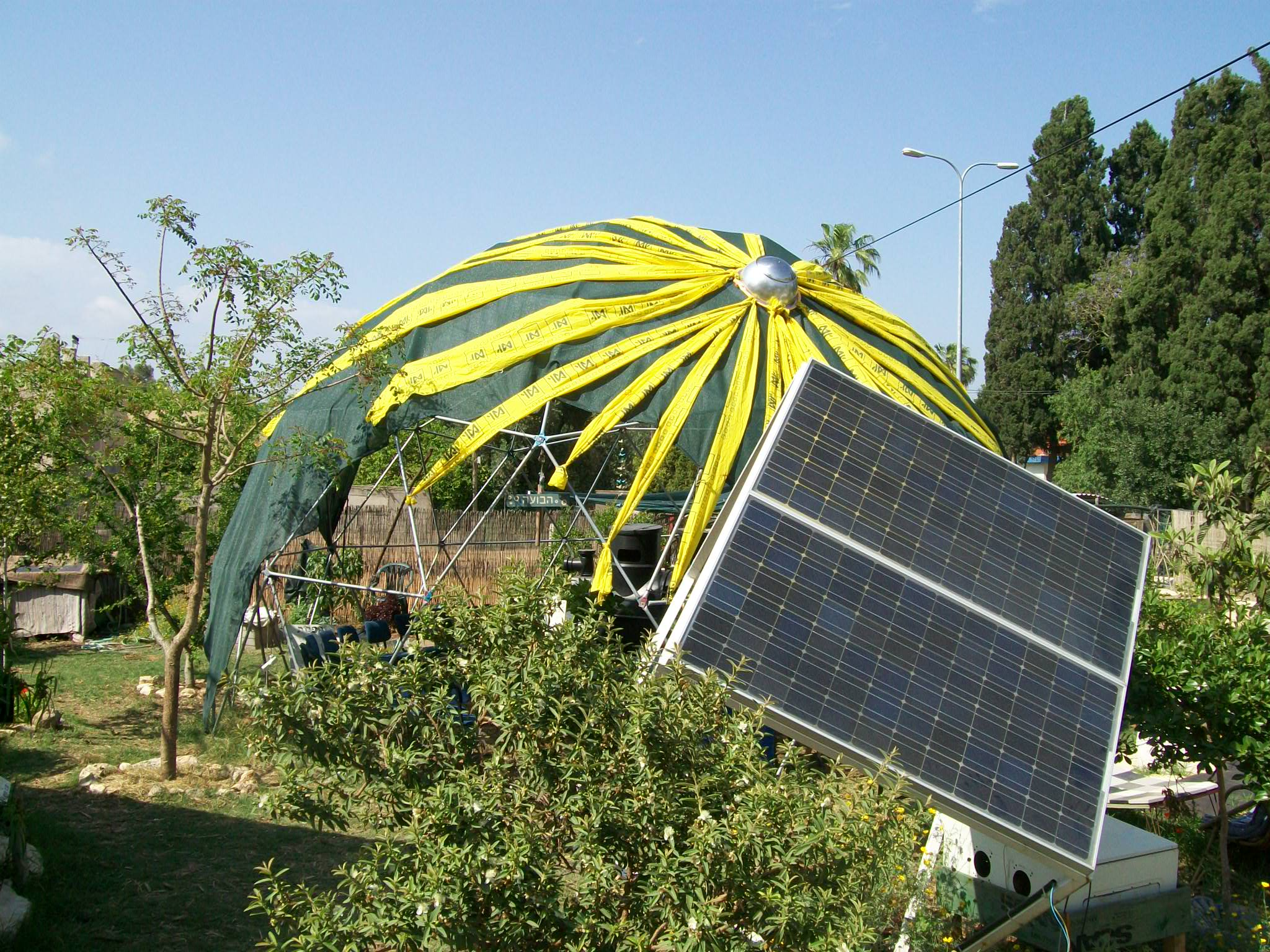
The Solar Garden in Binyamina in 2013

The Solar Garden (Hebrew: הגן הסולארי, Hagan haSolari) is an idealistic center in Binyamina, Israel, approximately 40 kilometers south of Haifa on the shore of the Mediterranean Sea. The center focuses mainly on solar energy (hence the name) and other alternative sources of energy power. Furthermore, The Solar Garden develops small-scale techniques to preserve the environment, such as a garbage-sorting and a recycling project based on a wide range of reusable materials, the production of compost and aquaponic systems.

The project was initiated by Yaniv Fieldust in January 2011, because of his concern about the state of the environment in Israel and the lack of awareness amongst the Israeli people of this.

The Solar Garden also develops projects in the area of educational guidance to (school)children about topics that have to do with environment-friendly ways of generating sustainable power, growing crops, recycling and the use of organic materials.

The Solar Garden is maintained not only by its founder, but also by many volunteers both from Israel and abroad.
