= Urban Growers Collective =

- Formation: 2017
- Type: Non-profit
- Headquarters: 1200 W. 35th Street Pl. Chicago, Illinois 60608; United States
- Founders: Erika Allen, Laurell Sims
- Website: urbangrowerscollective.org

Urban Growers Collective is a non-profit organization that builds urban farms, gardens, and provides fresh foods primarily in underprivileged areas in the West and South Side of Chicago. The organization was founded in Chicago, Illinois in 2017 by Erika Allen and Laurell Sims. As of 2019, there are eight urban farms that have been created and are run by Urban Growers Collective.

== History ==
Urban Growers Collective was formerly known as Growing Power, which was founded in Milwaukee, Wisconsin by Erika Allen's father, Will Allen in 2003. Will Allen was a retired professional basketball player that transitioned into urban farming when he formed the organization. Allen won a genius grant from the MacArthur Foundation in 2008 for his work and achievements in Growing Power. Will Allen retired due to Growing Power struggling financially from its lack of capital. Growing Power closed in November 2017 along with its primary and biggest farm Iron Street. Urban Growers Collective was founded shortly afterward by Allen's daughter, Erika. Erika Allen was provided resources from the now-closed Iron Street farm, and also received a donation from an unnamed funder. She used these resources to create a seven-acre farm in South Chicago located on 90th St. and Lake Shore Drive. This South Chicago farm remains the largest farm that is run by Urban Growers Collective. Erika Allen and co-founder Laurell Sims have created multiple urban farms and gardens with Urban Growers Collective since its start in late 2017. As of August 2018, the non-profit has 25 full-time staff members who work from Urban Growers Collective's main office in Bridgeport.

== Initiatives ==
With Urban Growers Collective's eight urban farms and gardens, multiple programs are now taking place. Urban Growers Collective provides food access, job-readiness, beautification programs, and food literacy education towards people living in the South and West sides of Chicago. One of the main goals of the organization is to ensure weekly visits to health and senior centers, schools, CTA stops and other locations on the city's South and West Sides, with the main focus being to ensure healthier foods in poor areas. The group uses Urban farming as a tool to heal communities of youth and their families who have suffered from excessive trauma and violence. Another big goal for the group is to provide recovery from the historical impact of structural racism that accrued through the agricultural system in the past.

=== Grounds for Peace ===
Grounds for Peace was a program initiated by Mayor Lori Lightfoot in the Summer of 2019. This 18-month long program combines non-profit organizations Urban Growers Collective and Heartland Alliance to connect urban farming and gardening initiatives with younger at risk males in the areas of Woodlawn, Englewood, and North Lawndale. The City of Chicago donated $7.4 million towards greening workforce development programs in 2019, and $250,000 of this total was used to fund the program. The program will convert 50 vacant lots into gardens to fight gun violence with beautification. The objective of this program is to provide men who are more likely to be participants or victims of violent crimes, with training in landscaping and property maintenance. The organizations hopes are that by providing beautification to the landscapes individuals will not want to commit crimes in those specific areas. The main goal is to prevent future crime in Chicago areas with high crime rates, while also providing people with skills that can assist them in obtaining more job opportunities in the future.

=== Youth Camp and Touring Program ===
Urban Grower Collective's youth camp and touring program provides teenagers who are attending Chicago Public Schools with new knowledge in farming, gardening, and the initiatives of the program itself. Urban Growers Collective partnered with After School Matters to make this initiative possible. The camp serves as a tool for teenagers to learn about and partake in the agricultural process itself, while the touring program allows students to teach tourists about the agricultural process and the program. The program also takes advantage of the work being done on the gardens to teach students about advocacy, environmentalism, and public speaking, which is useful for students to teach others who visit the touring program. The program pays students who work on the garden for their participation, in order to further help students who need income during their summer breaks. While the eight urban farms that Urban Growers Collective manages are primarily on the West and South sides of Chicago, the camp and touring program takes place in downtown Chicago. The organization also sponsors 300 teens with internships every year to provide further education on the farming process.

=== Fresh Moves Mobile Market ===
Urban Growers Collective has provided fresh produce to people in South Side neighborhoods of Chicago through CTA buses that were transformed into mobile farmers markets. This allowed neighborhoods that lacked grocery stores to have less expensive produce, and closer locations to provide healthier options for locals. Urban Growers Collective is able to supply the markets with fresh food by providing produce which is obtained from their multiple farms located in Chicago. Customers can pay for the food on the buses with cash, credit/debit cards, and through SNAP (Supplemental Nutrition Assistance Program). Children and adults work on the farms and are given the opportunity to train and work under Urban Growers Collective. Urban Growers Collective hit a milestone of locals served through their Fresh Moves Mobile Market program. As of August 22, 2018, Urban Growers Collective had served over 10,000 produce items to people living in the south and west sides of Chicago. This also includes selling and providing fresh produce locally to events around Chicago such as the yearly Bridgeport Farmers Market event. Work that the urban farms require include weeding, planting, and harvesting in the gardens. Urban Growers Collective also provides opportunities to learn about the science and social implications behind the agricultural work while they work on the farms.

== Events ==
=== 2018 Gala ===
Urban Grower Collective's fundraising Gala event took place on October 4, 2018, at the Theater on the Lake in Chicago located at 2401 N Lake Shore Dr, Chicago, IL 60614. Supporters and partners of the organization attended.

=== 2019 Gala ===
Urban Grower's Collective held their second fundraising Gala on September 19, 2019, in Chicago. Held at the Theater on the Lake in Chicago, supporters and partners of the organization gathered to show their support the organization.
