= Aquaponics =

Food production system

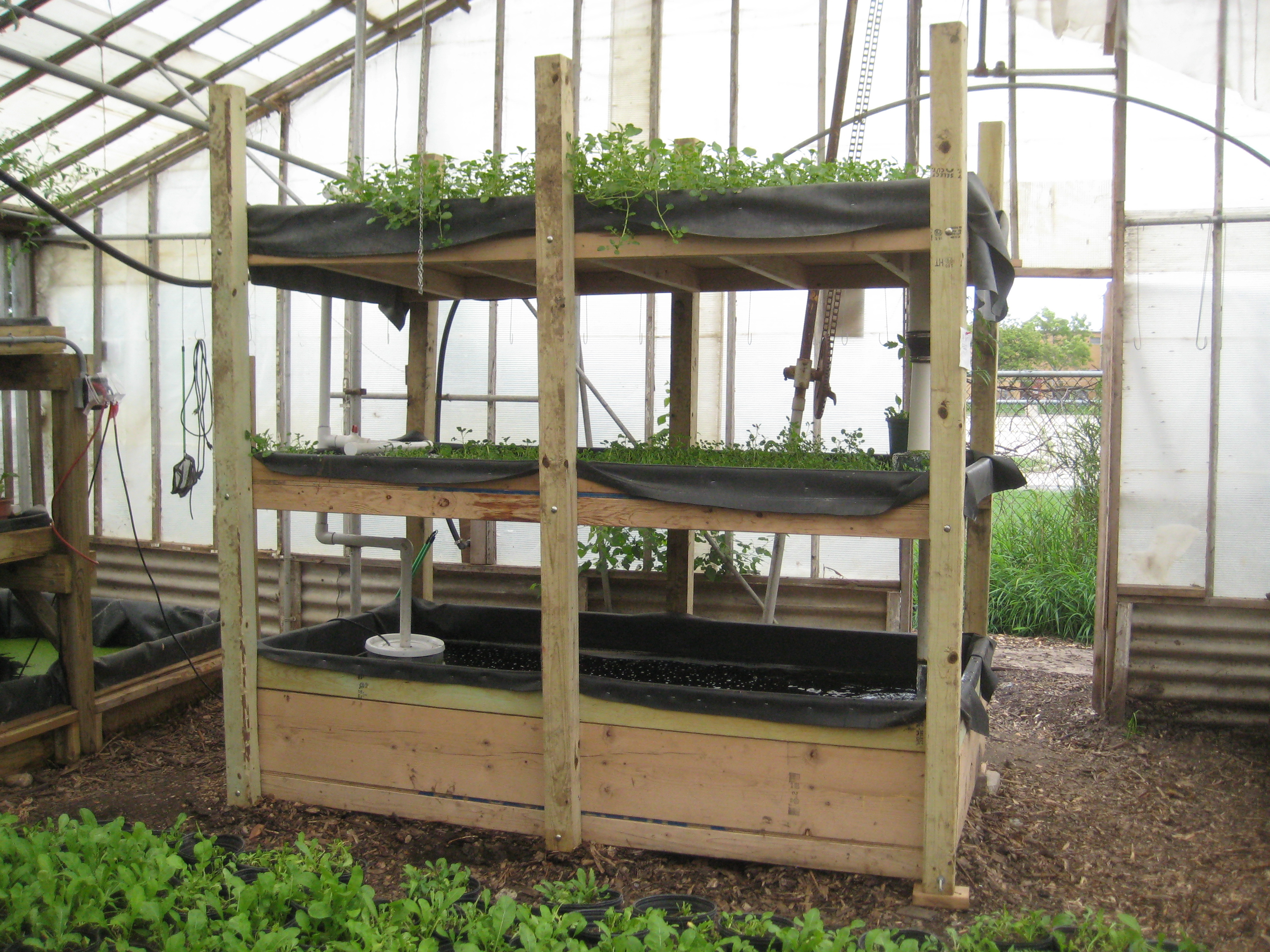
A small, portable aquaponics system.

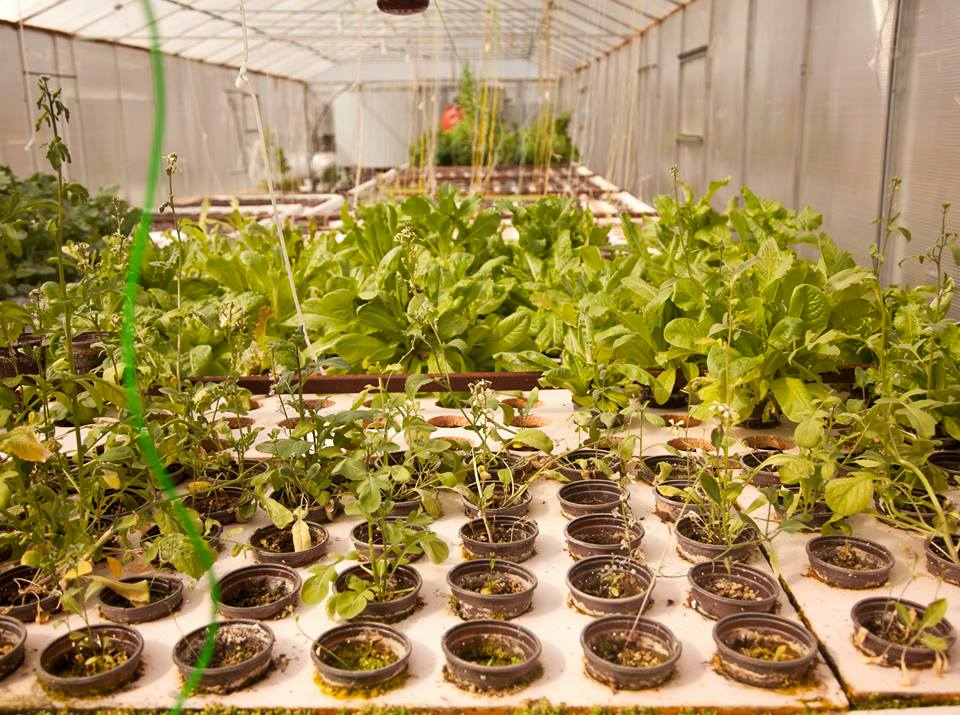
Aquaponic greenhouse in Apaga

Aquaponics is a food production system that couples aquaculture (raising aquatic animals such as fish, crayfish, snails or prawns in tanks) with hydroponics (cultivating plants in water) whereby the nutrient-rich aquaculture water is fed to hydroponically grown plants.

Plants are grown in hydroponics systems, with their roots immersed in the nutrient-rich effluent water. This enables them to filter out the ammonia that is toxic to the aquatic animals, or its metabolites. After the water has passed through the hydroponic subsystem, it is cleaned and oxygenated, and can return to the aquaculture vessels.

The size, complexity, and types of foods grown in an aquaponic system can vary as much as any system found in either distinct farming discipline. Fish commonly raised in aquaponics include tilapia, koi, goldfish, carp, catfish, barramundi, and different types of ornamental fish. Many plants are commonly grown in aquaponics, for example lettuce, pak choi, kale, basil, mint, watercress, tomatoes, peppers, cucumbers, beans, peas, squash, broccoli, cauliflower, and cabbage.

Fish, plants and microbes are three main components of aquaponics, and microbes play the bridge role of converting fish waste to plant nutrients. The three major types of modern aquaponic designs are deep-water or "raft", nutrient film technology, and media-based bed or reciprocating systems.

== System types ==
Generally, aquaponics systems are classified into three types, namely media-based grow bed, deep water culture/floating raft, and nutrient film technique. Among them, the media-based system is believed to be more efficient in the utilization of nitrogen.

=== Media-based grow bed ===
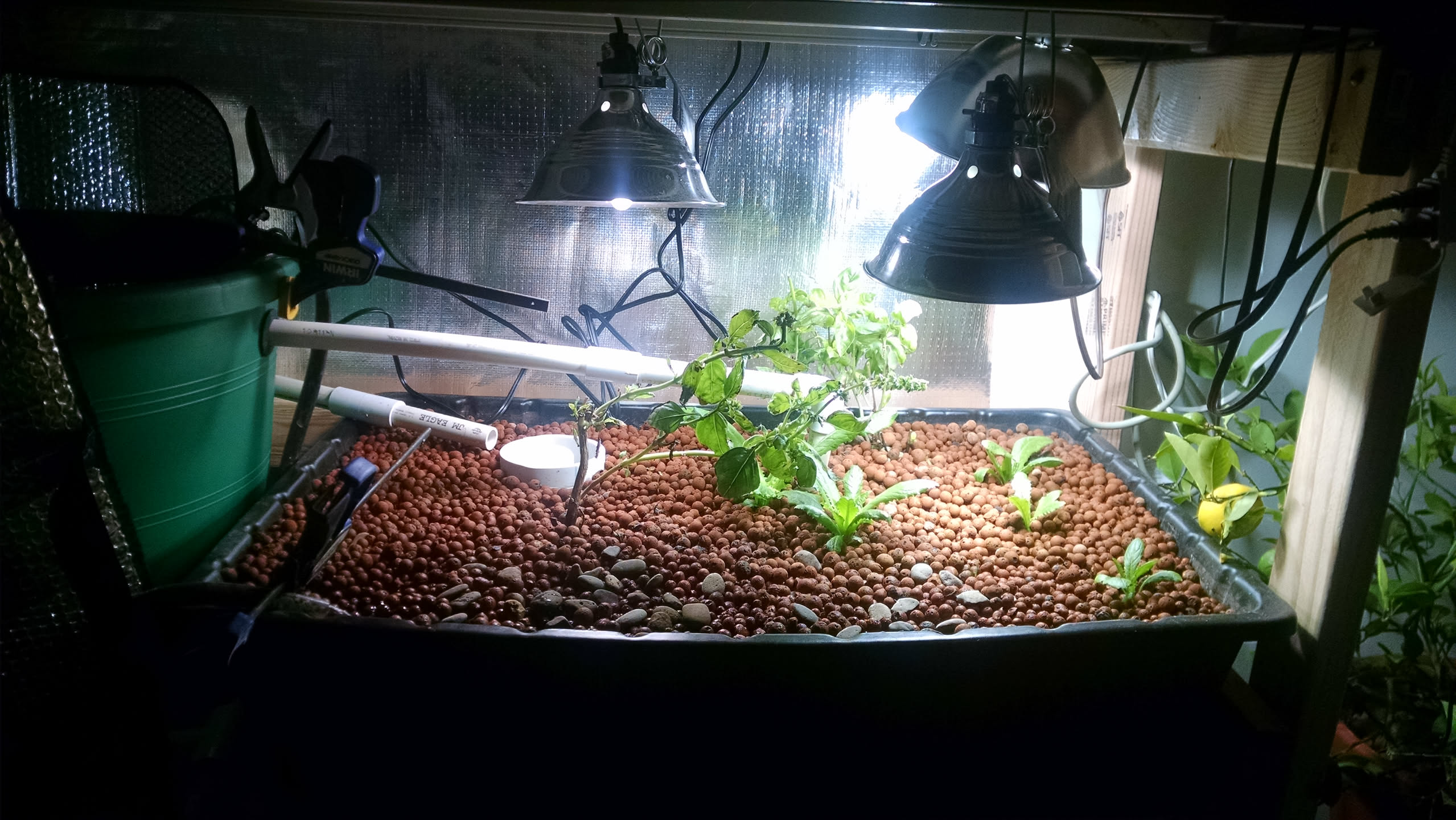
A media-based grow bed, with plants growing in it and pipes for water

A media-based grow bed is a hydroponic system type that utilizes a trough filled with an inert material to assist plant roots and accommodate beneficial microbes. Water is usually delivered in a flooding and draining cycle (ebb and flow), delivering nutrients and oxygen to the plants.

By utilizing gravel or sand as plant supporting medium, solids are captured and the medium has enough surface area for fixed-film nitrification. The ability to combine biofiltration and hydroponics allows for aquaponic system, in many cases, to eliminate the need for an expensive, separate biofilter.

A media‐based system is believed to be more efficient in the utilization of nitrogen since it provides more volume‐to‐surface area ratio for the microbes than deep-water raft or nutrient film technique.

=== Deep water culture ===
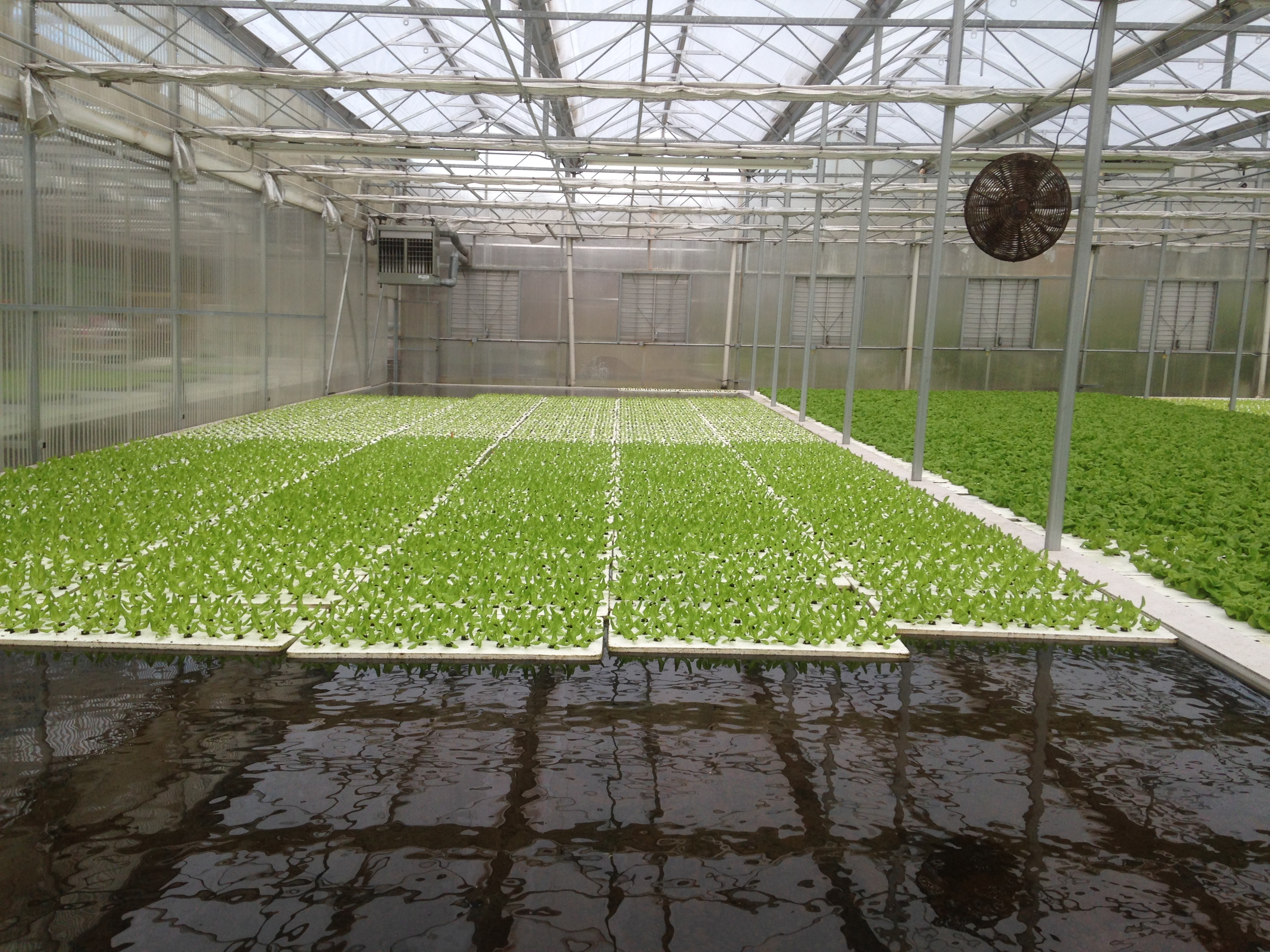
Lettuce being grown in a deep water culture

The deep water culture system consists of substantial troughs containing perforated floating rafts, into which net plant pots are placed. Within the system, these plant pots are typically filled with media, such as rockwool, coco, or pumice, that serve to support the roots, which are subsequently and continuously submerged within the water tank.

=== Nutrient film technique ===
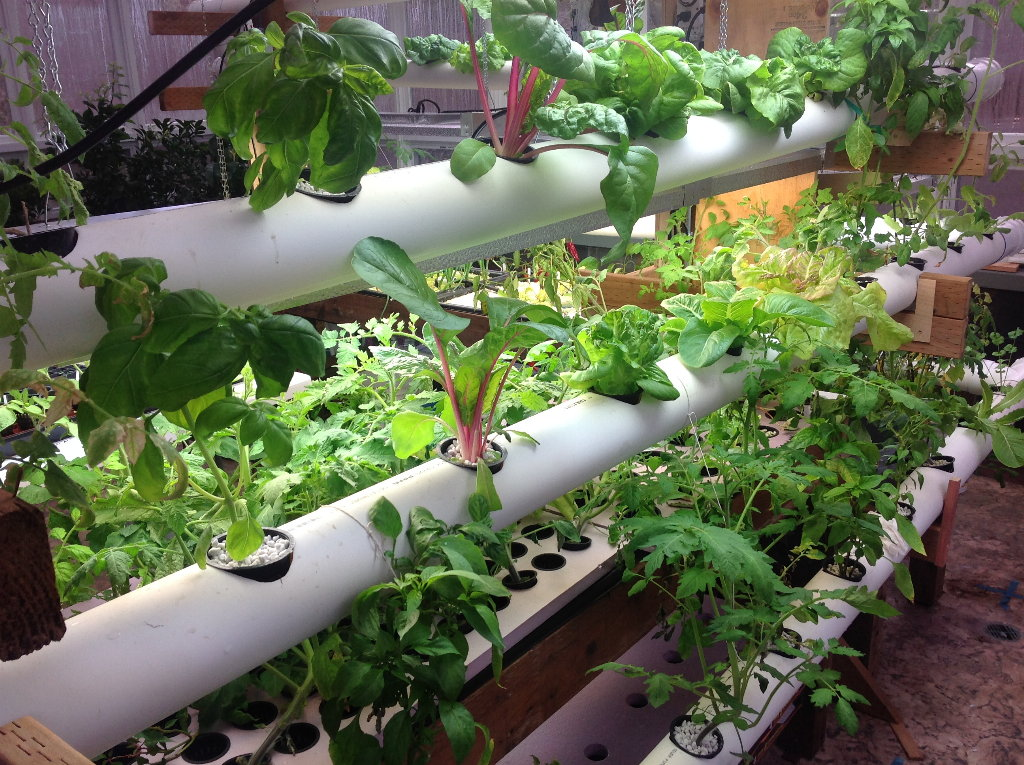
A hydroponic system using the nutrient film technique. This technique is similar in hydroponics and aquaponics, the difference being the source of nutrients.

The nutrient film technique consists of narrow channels of perforated squared pipes where the roots are partially immersed in a thin layer of streaming water.

== History ==
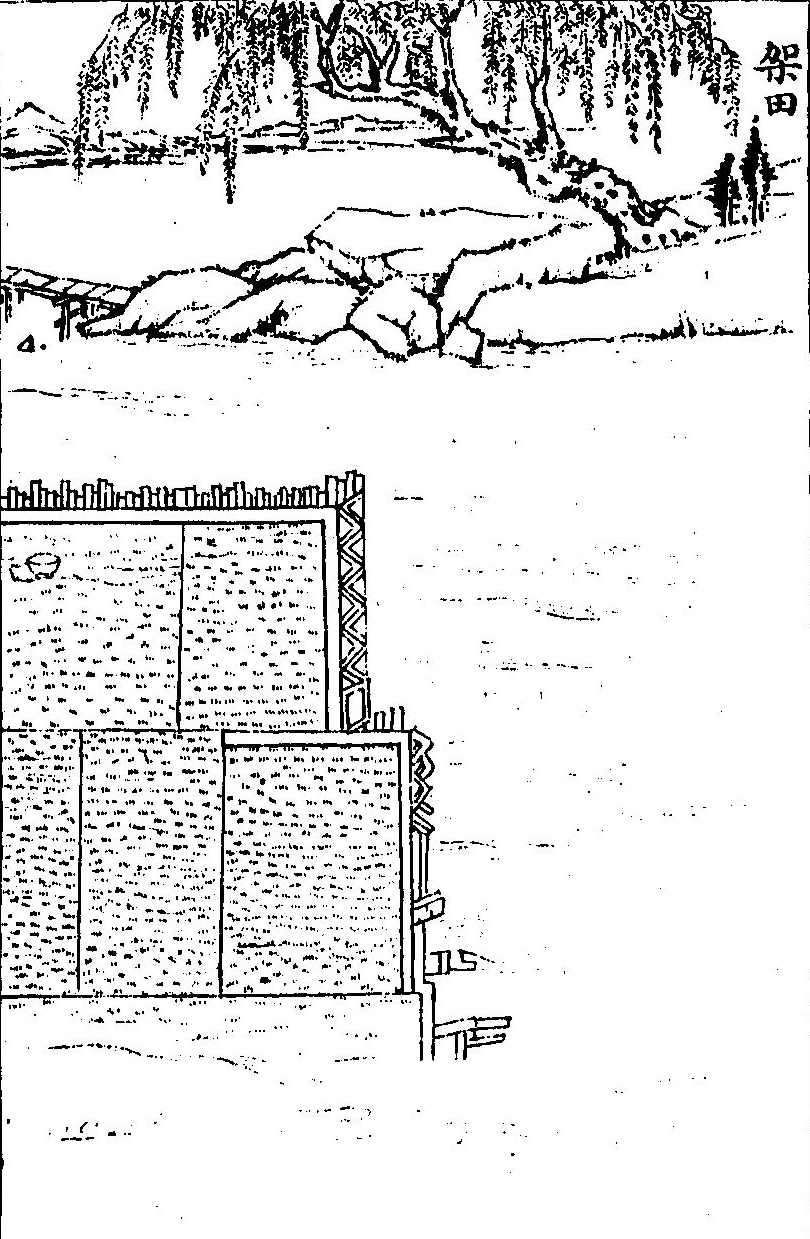
Woodcut from the 13th-century Chinese agricultural manual Wang Zhen's Book on Farming (王禎農書) showing rice grown in a floating raft planter system (架田, lit "framed paddy") in a pond

Aquaponics has ancient roots, although there is some debate on its first occurrence.

=== Early beginnings: Aztecs and Chinese (6th century - 13th century) ===
Aquaponics has been said to have evolved from relatively ancient agriculture practices associated with integrating fish culture with plant production, especially those developed within the South East Asian, flooded rice paddy farming context and South American Chinampa, floating island, agriculture practices (Komives and Junge 2015). In reality, historically, fish were rarely actively added to rice paddy fields until the nineteenth century (Halwart and Gupta 2004) and were present in very low densities which would not contribute to any substantial nutritive assistance to the plants. Chinampas were traditionally built on lakes in Mexico where nutrient advantages may have been supplied via the eutrophic or semi-eutrophic lake sediments rather than directly from any designed or actively integrated fish production system (Morehart 2016; Baquedano 1993).

- The Aztec cultivated agricultural islands known as chinampas in a system considered by some to be an early form of aquaponics for agricultural use, where plants were raised on stationary (or sometime movable) islands in lake shallows and waste materials dredged from the Chinampa canals and surrounding cities were used to manually irrigate the plants.
- South China and the whole of Southeast Asia, where rice was cultivated and farmed in paddy fields in combination with fish, are cited as examples of early aquaponics systems, although the technology had been brought by Chinese settlers who had migrated from Yunnan around 5 AD. These polycultural farming systems existed in many Far Eastern countries and raised fish such as the oriental loach (泥鳅, ドジョウ), swamp eel (黄鳝, 田鰻), common carp (鯉魚, コイ) and crucian carp (鯽魚) as well as pond snails (田螺) in the paddies.
- The 13th-century Chinese agricultural manual Wang Zhen's Book on Farming (王禎農書) described floating wooden rafts which were piled with mud and dirt and which were used for growing rice, wild rice, and fodder. Such floating planters were employed in regions constituting the modern provinces of Jiangsu, Zhejiang, and Fujian. These floating planters are known as either jiatian (架田) or fengtian (葑田), which translates to "framed paddy" and "brassica paddy", respectively. The agricultural work also references earlier Chinese texts, which indicated that floating raft rice cultivation was being used as early as the Tang dynasty (6th century) and Northern Song dynasty (8th century) periods of Chinese history.

=== Modern developments (1930s-present) ===
An integrated system of aquaculture and agriculture where fish are grown in rice paddies has been employed in the North Kerian area of Perak in Peninsular Malaysia since the 1930's. Several rice-fish systems are also reported to have a long history in Indonesia.

In 1965, Sengbusch and his colleagues were the first to attempt raising common carp, a type of fish, in tanks with a system that recirculated water and used activated sludge to treat the water. A few years later, in 1971, Scherb and Braun provided more detailed studies on using a similar system to raise rainbow trout. At the South Carolina Agricultural Experiment Station in Clemson, researchers Loyacano and Grosvenor (1973) tried to clean fish ponds with channel catfish by using water chestnut plants to absorb the extra nutrients.

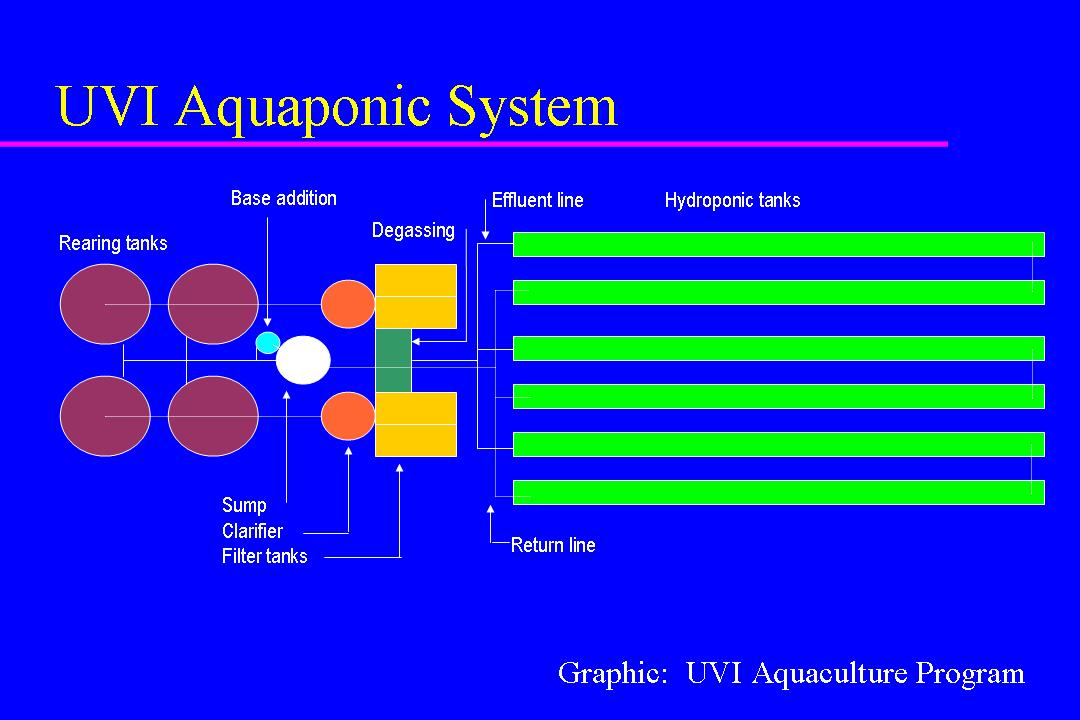
Diagram of the University of the Virgin Islands commercial aquaponics system designed to yield 5 metric tons of Tilapia per year.

In 1977, German scientist Ludwig C.A. Naegel contributed to the field of aquaponics with his publication 'Combined Production of Fish and Plants in Recirculating Water.' The work presented experiments on the co-cultivation of tilapia and tomatoes, showcasing the practicality of a recirculating system that supports both fish and plant production. This research is among the efforts by a global community of researchers to develop modern aquaponics systems.

Balarin and Haller conducted studies on the thermal dynamics of aquaponic systems, examining the effects of varying water temperatures on the growth rates of fish and plants.

In the development of biofiltration techniques within aquaponics, Muir, Paller, and Lewis introduced reciprocating biofilters (RBFs). These biofilters enhanced the efficiency of nutrient uptake by plants and reduced the accumulation of harmful metabolites in the water.

Watten and Busch contributed to the understanding of nutrient dynamics in aquaponic systems. Their studies on the integration of vascular plants into recirculating aquaculture systems (RAS) demonstrated how plants could effectively extract excess nutrients from the water.

Prior to the technological advances of the 1980s, most attempts to integrate hydroponics and aquaculture had limited success. Many of the modern developments and discoveries of aquaponics are generally attributed to the New Alchemy Institute and North Carolina State University.

=== New Alchemy Institute ===
In 1969, John and Nancy Todd and William McLarney founded the New Alchemy Institute and built a prototype replica of the Aztec's aquaponic system (with some modifications) to provide shelter, vegetables, and fish throughout the year. In 1984, Ronald Zweig of the New Alchemy Institute developed a system he called the 'hydroponic aquaculture pond,' also referred to as a 'hydroponic solar pond.' This system integrated a floating hydroponic component within the institute's existing solar pond these floating raft systems are the foundation for what became later known as deep water culture.

=== North Carolina State University ===
Mark McMurtry and others at North Carolina State University conceptualized the Integrated Aqua-Vegeculture System. This system, which integrates aquaculture with sand-based grow beds, represents one of the earliest instances of a closed-loop aquaponic system. McMurtry's research and findings confirmed much of the foundational science underlying aquaponics, demonstrating that the system operates effectively.

=== University of the Virgin Islands ===
In 1979, James Rakocy and his colleagues at the University of the Virgin Islands began experimenting with media beds in aquaponics. Initially, the system utilized a gravel bed for plant growth, alongside a conical filter settling tank to collect larger solid waste, and a separate tank for housing the fish. In 1986, they started to test the use of floating rafts constructed from polystyrene. By 1997, Rakocy's research had led to the adoption of deep water culture hydroponic grow beds in large-scale aquaponic systems.

=== Other systems ===
Other institutes focused their research on systems known as "ebb and flow," or "flood and drain" systems. These systems utilize coarse media like gravel or expanded clay, with bell siphons facilitating the irrigation cycle These systems are sometimes referred to as "Speraneo Systems," as they were named after Tom and Paula Speraneo, who created and sold an instructional manual in the 1990s and adopted the North Carolina State University system to invent a full-size commercial-scale solar greenhouse.

The first aquaponics research in Canada began with a small system integrated into aquaculture research at a station in Lethbridge, Alberta. In the 1990s, commercial aquaponics setups increased, focusing on high-value crops like trout and lettuce. A key development occurred in Brooks, Alberta, where Dr. Nick Savidov and his team from Lethbridge College's Aquaculture Centre of Excellence (ACE) conducted extensive research. They found rapid root growth in aquaponics systems and effective methods for closing the solid-waste loop. They also discovered that these systems could efficiently operate at low pH levels, which benefits plant growth but is typically unfavorable for fish. This research led to the creation of the first fully automated zero-waste aquaponics system, enhancing sustainability and efficiency in aquaponics operations.

Floating aquaponics systems on polycultural fish ponds were installed in China in 2009. They are used to grow rice, wheat and canna lily and other crops, with some installations exceeding 2.5 acres (10,000 m^{2}).

=== Terminology ===
The term "aquaponics" combines "aquaculture" (the farming of aquatic organisms) and "hydroponics" (the soilless cultivation of plants).

In the 1970s and 1980s, aquaponics was described by various terms such as "combined fish and vegetable production in greenhouses" or "combined production of fish and plants in recirculating water." The term "aquaponics" became more widely used after the Aquaponics Journal began publication in 1997, although other terms like "integrated fish/vegetable co-culture system" were also used.

Definitions of "aquaponics" vary. Some experts limit it to plant cultivation using hydroponics, while others have a broader interpretation. The suffix "ponics" in hydroponics and aquaponics comes from the Greek word "ponos," meaning "work." Therefore, "aquaponics" can be translated to "water work," though this may not fully describe the system's function and purpose.

Currently, aquaponics is not included in the European Union's organic agriculture certification scheme because it uses hydroponics. However, other forms of aquaponics that involve soil-based organic food production could potentially be certified as organic.

== Parts of an aquaponic system ==
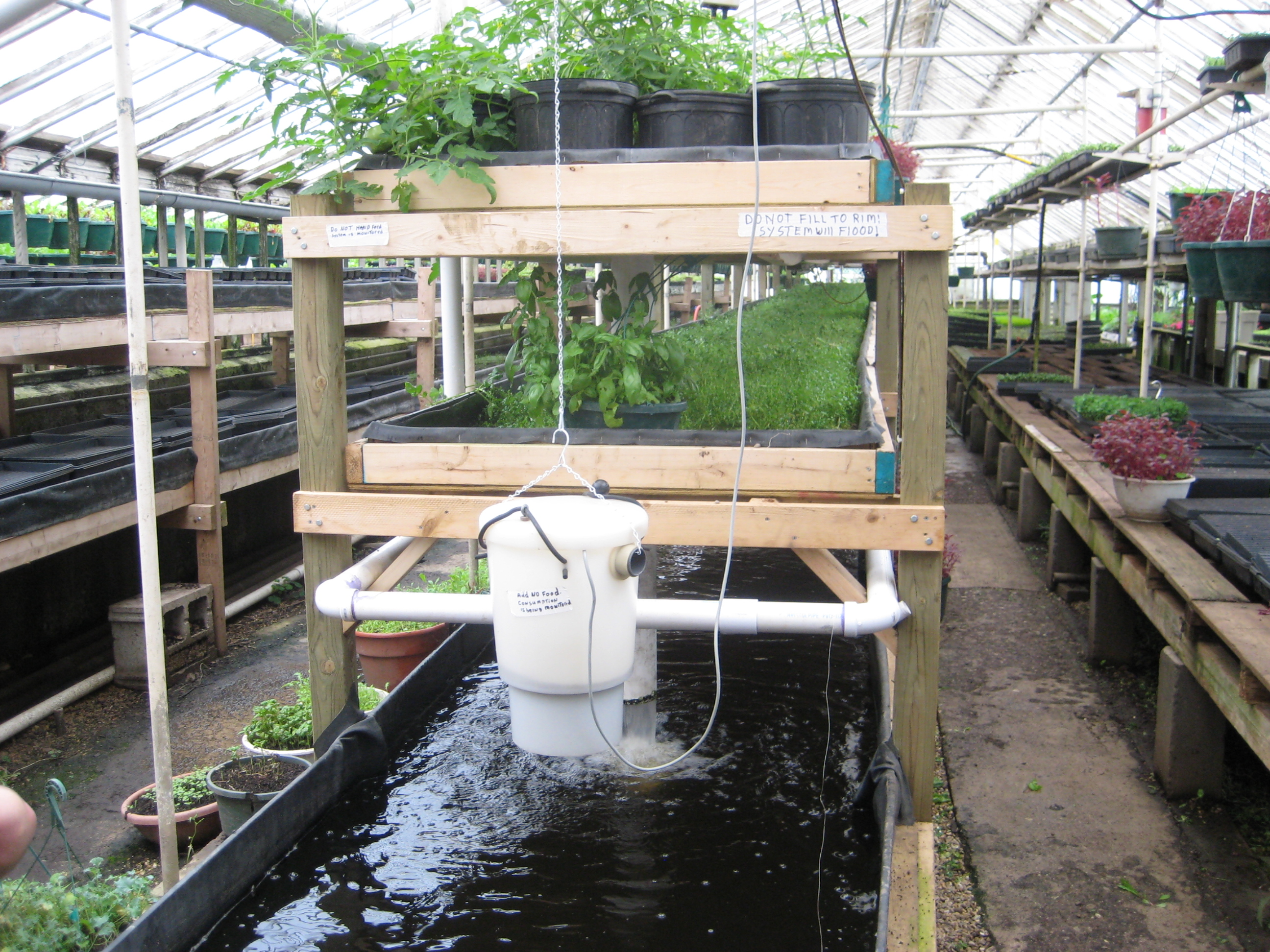
A commercial aquaponics system. An electric pump moves nutrient-rich water from the fish tank through a solids filter to remove particles the plants above cannot absorb. The water then provides nutrients for the plants and is cleansed before returning to the fish tank below.

Aquaponics consists of two main parts, with the aquaculture part for raising aquatic animals and the hydroponics part for growing plants. Although consisting primarily of these two parts, aquaponics systems are usually grouped into several components or subsystems depending on the type of system. Depending on the sophistication and cost of the aquaponics system, the units for solids removal, biofiltration, and/or the hydroponics subsystem may be combined into one unit or subsystem.

=== Rearing tank ===
The tanks for raising and feeding the fish.

=== Hydroponic subsystem ===
The portion of the system where plants are grown by absorbing excess nutrients from the water.

=== Water pump ===
Used to circulate water.

=== Settling basin (optional) ===
A unit, also known as a clarifier, for catching uneaten food and detached biofilms, and for settling out fine particulates.

=== Biofilter (optional) ===
A place where the nitrification bacteria can grow and convert ammonia into nitrates, which are usable by the plants; A biofilter is optional.

=== Sump (optional) ===
Certain systems use a sump. The sump is equipped with a pump or pump inlet that circulates the treated culture water back to the rearing tanks.

== Live components ==
Aquaponic systems rely on a symbiotic relationship between three main live components: plants, fish (or other aquatic animals), and bacteria. Some systems also include additional live components like worms.

=== Plants ===
- Plants are the primary producers in an aquaponic system, converting sunlight, carbon dioxide, and nutrients into biomass.
- A wide variety of plants can be grown in aquaponic systems, including leafy green vegetables, herbs, fruits, and vegetables.
- Plants help to purify the water by removing excess nutrients and waste products.

Since plants at different growth stages require different amounts of minerals and nutrients, plant harvesting is staggered with seedlings growing at the same time as mature plants. This ensures stable nutrient content in the water because of continuous symbiotic cleansing of toxins from the water.

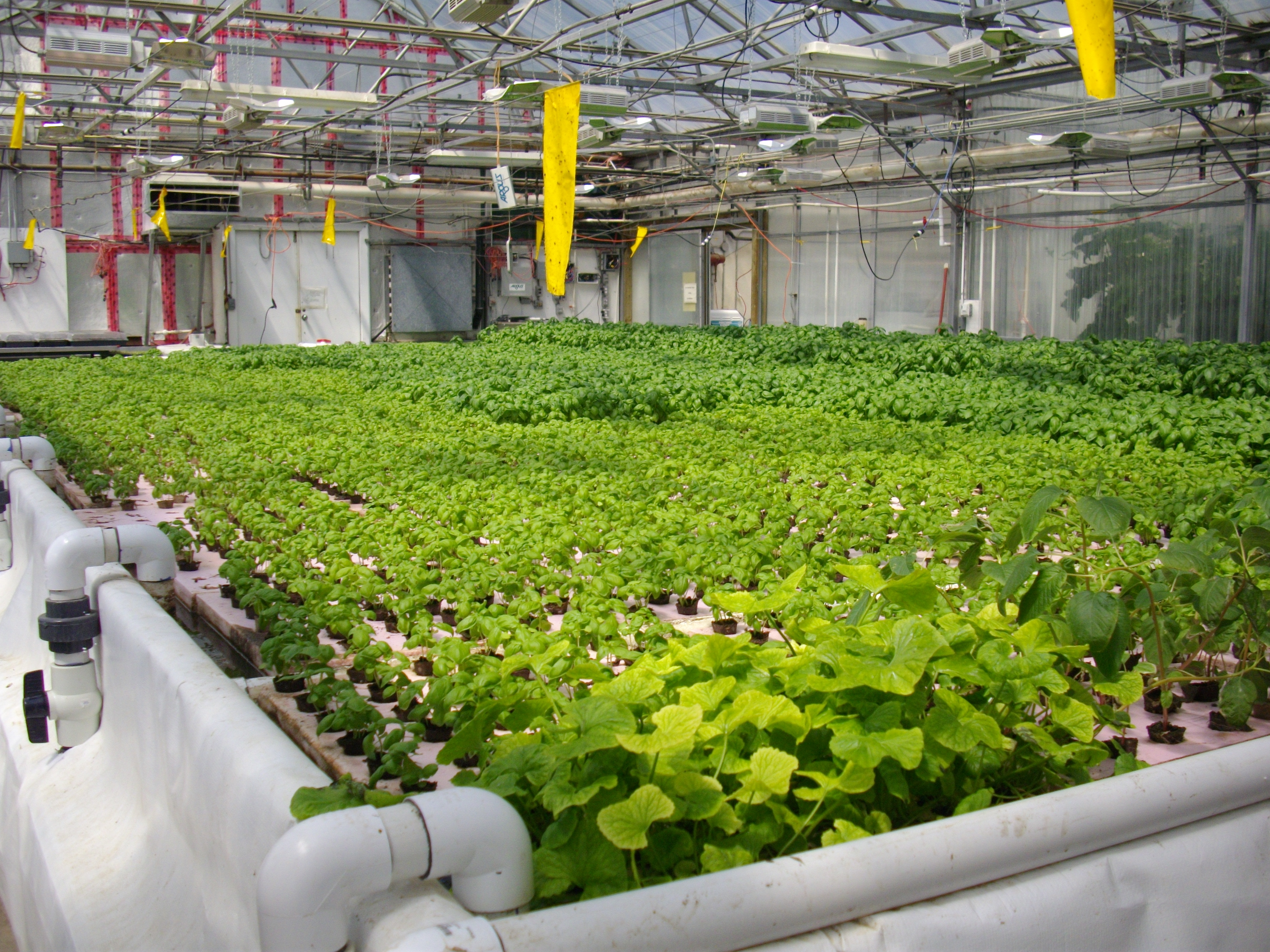
A Deep Water Culture hydroponics system where plant grow directly into the effluent rich water without a soil medium. Plants can be spaced closer together because the roots do not need to expand outwards to support the weight of the plant.

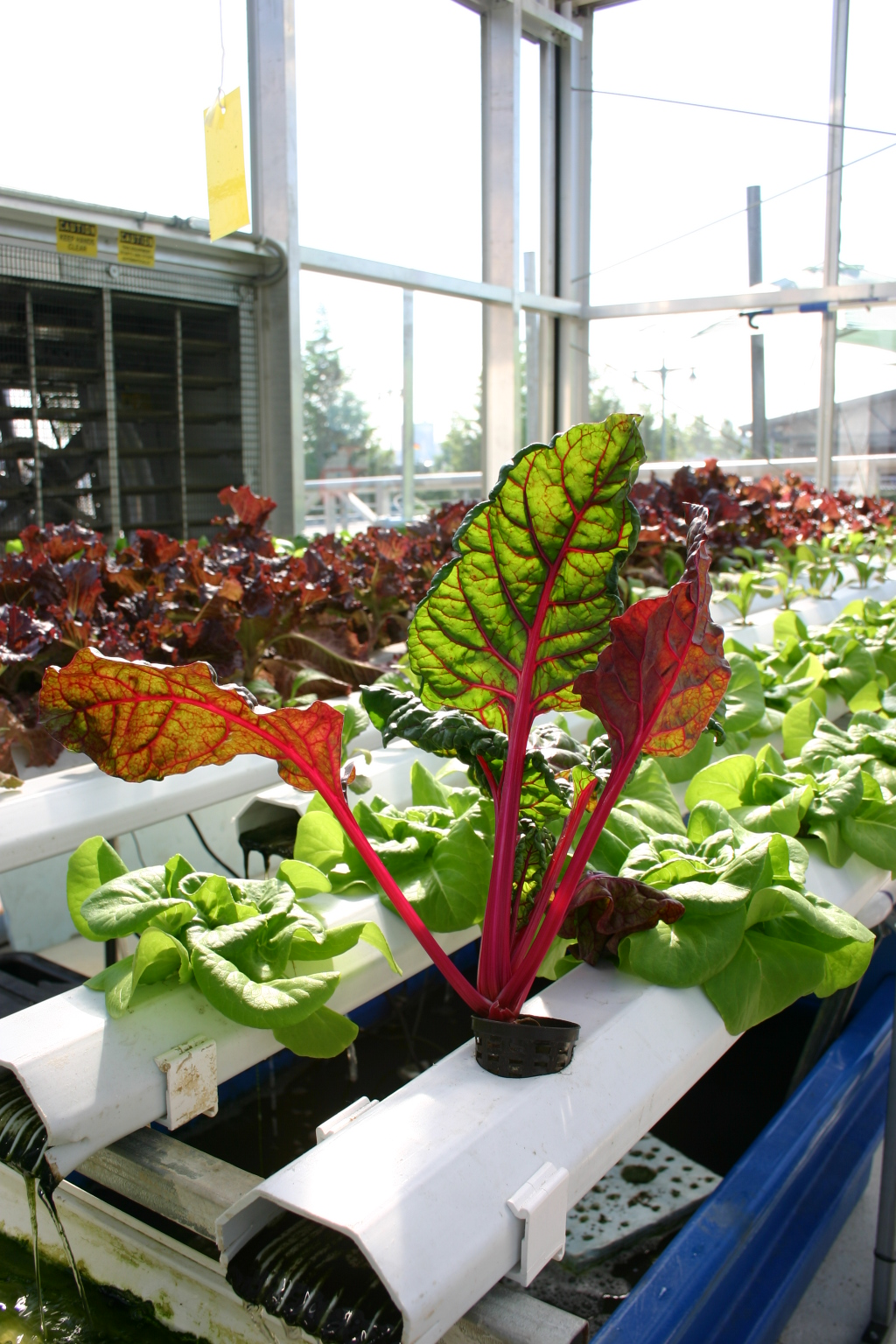
Plant placed into a nutrient rich water channel in a nutrient film technique system

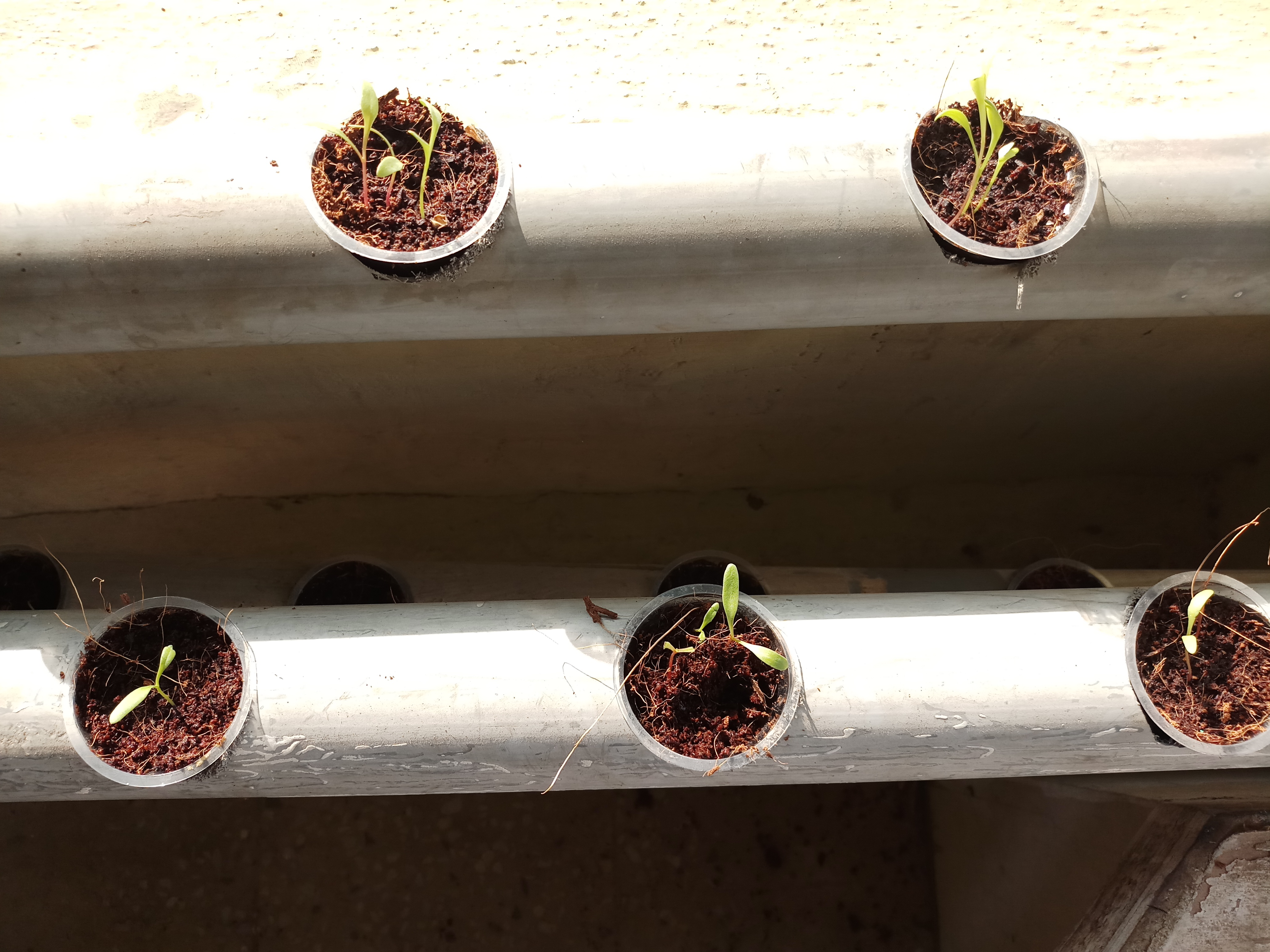
Spinach seedlings, 5 days old, by aquaponics

=== Fish (or other aquatic creatures) ===
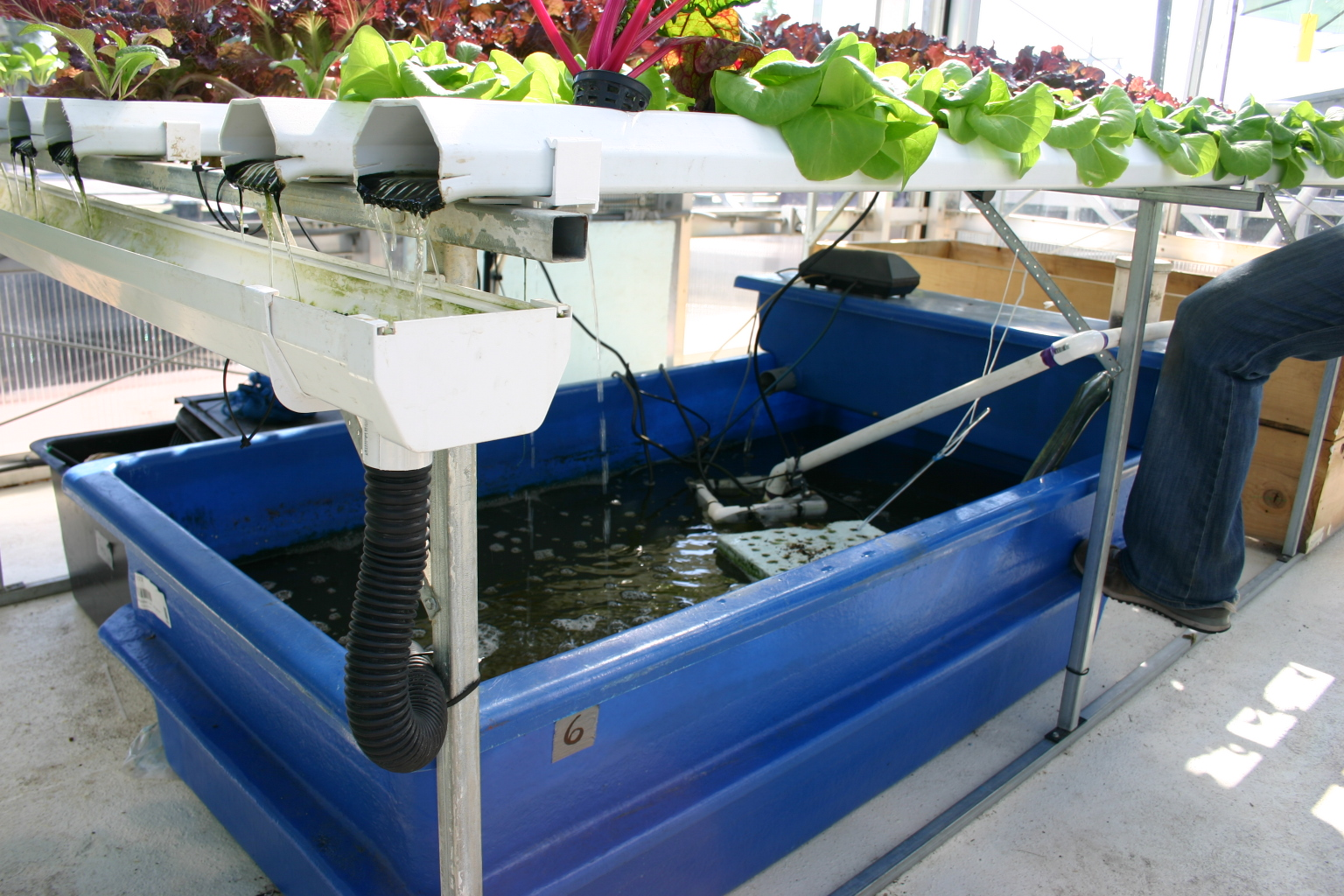
Filtered water from the hydroponics system drains into a catfish tank for re-circulation.

- Fish and other aquatic animals are the primary consumers in an aquaponic system, providing a source of protein and nutrients for the plants.
- A variety of fish species can be used in aquaponic systems, including tilapia, goldfish, and koi.
- Fish help to fertilize the plants by producing 'waste' that is rich in nutrients

=== Bacteria ===
- Bacteria play a crucial role in aquaponic systems, converting ammonia from fish waste into nitrate, a nutrient that can be used by plants.
- Beneficial bacteria, such as Nitrosomonas and Nitrobacter, are essential for maintaining a healthy and balanced ecosystem.
- Bacteria help to purify the water by removing excess ammonia and other waste products.

=== Algae ===
While often regarded as a nuisance in traditional aquaculture, algae can be a beneficial component in certain aquaponic designs. In systems such as Integrated Aqua-Vegeculture System, algae are intentionally cultivated in the surface layer of the biofilter. In these systems, algae act as a nutrient sink, absorbing excess nutrients, which helps maintain optimal water quality and reduces the risk of nutrient imbalances. However, not all aquaponic systems utilize algae in this way; in other types of systems, algae in the fish tank are considered a nuisance that needs to be controlled.

Algae can release substances that can be harmful to fish, other microorganisms, and plants. For example, blue-green algae, also known as cyanobacteria, can produce toxins that directly threaten the health of fish, and their physical presence can damage the gills of fish.

== Biofilter ==
Aquatic effluents, resulting from uneaten feed or raising animals like fish, accumulate in water due to the closed-system recirculation of most aquaculture systems. The effluent-rich water becomes toxic to the aquatic animal in high concentrations but this contains nutrients essential for plant growth.

Typically, after a system has stabilized ammonia levels range from 0.25 to .50 ppm; nitrite levels range from 0.0 to 0.25 ppm, and nitrate levels range from 5 to 150 ppm. During system startup, systems take several weeks to begin the nitrification process. As a result, spikes may occur in the levels of ammonia (up to 6.0 ppm) and nitrite (up to 15 ppm) as the nitrosomonas and nitrobacter bacteria have yet to establish populations within the system. Nitrate levels peak later in the startup phase as the system completes nitrogen cycles and maintains a healthy biofilter and these bacteria grow into a mature colony. with nitrate levels peaking later in the startup phase. In the nitrification process ammonia is oxidized into nitrite, which releases hydrogen ions into the water. Over time, the water's pH will slowly drop, non-sodium bases such as potassium hydroxide or calcium hydroxide can be used to neutralize the water's pH if insufficient quantities are naturally present in the water to provide a buffer against acidification. In addition, selected minerals or nutrients such as iron can be added in addition to the fish waste that serves as the main source of nutrients to plants.

== Operation ==
The five main inputs to the system are water, oxygen, light, feed given to the aquatic animals, and electricity to pump, filter, and oxygenate the water. Spawn or fry may be added to replace grown fish that are taken out from the system to retain a stable system. In terms of outputs, an aquaponics system may continually yield plants such as vegetables grown in hydroponics, and edible aquatic species raised in an aquaculture. Typical build ratios are .5 to 1 square foot of grow space for every 1 U.S. gal (3.8 L) of aquaculture water in the system. 1 U.S. gal (3.8 L) of water can support between .5 lb (0.23 kg) and 1 lb (0.45 kg) of fish stock depending on aeration and filtration.

=== Feed source ===
As in most aquaculture based systems, stock feed often consists of fish meal derived from lower-value species. Ongoing depletion of wild fish stocks makes this practice unsustainable. Organic fish feeds may prove to be a viable alternative that relieves this concern. Other alternatives include growing duckweed with an aquaponics system that feeds the same fish grown on the system, excess worms grown from vermiculture composting, using prepared kitchen scraps, as well as growing black soldier fly larvae to feed to the fish using composting grub growers.

=== Plant nutrients ===
Healthy plant growth relies on diverse organic compounds in the root environment, produced by microbial decomposition. These include vitamins, hormones, and enzymes, essential for growth, yield, flavor, and pathogen resistance. Organic matter like humic acid helps make micronutrients available. While inorganic nutrients are vital, plants need organic metabolites for optimal development.

=== Water usage ===
Aquaponic systems are designed to recirculate and reuse water efficiently, rather than discharging or exchanging it under normal operation. This system relies on the interaction between animals and plants to maintain a stable aquatic environment with minimal fluctuations in nutrient and oxygen levels. Plants absorb dissolved nutrients from the circulating water, which reduces the need for water discharge and minimizes the water exchange rate. Some authors have reported 90% less water usage through aquaponics compared to conventional commercial fish and crop production systems.

Water is added to the system only to replace losses due to plant absorption and transpiration, evaporation, overflow from rainfall, and removal of solid wastes. Consequently, aquaponics uses about 2% of the water required by conventional irrigation methods for the same vegetable production. This efficiency allows for the cultivation of crops and fish in areas with limited water or fertile land.

Aquaponic systems can also mimic controlled wetland conditions, making them useful for biofiltration and treating household sewage. The nutrient-rich overflow water can be collected in catchment tanks and reused to boost the growth of soil-planted crops or pumped back into the aquaponic system to maintain water levels.

In traditional aquaculture, regular water exchange is essential, unlike in aquaponics. Producing 1 kg of beef typically demands 5,000 to 20,000 liters of water. Semi-intensive and extensive conventional aquaculture requires 2,500 to 375,000 liters for the same amount of fish. In contrast, recirculating aquaculture systems (RAS) are highly efficient, recycling 95% to 99% of water and using under 100 liters per kilogram of fish.

=== Fish stocking ===
In order for aquaponic systems to be financially successful and make a profit whilst also covering its operating expenses, the hydroponic plant components and fish rearing components need to almost constantly be at maximum production capacity. To keep the bio-mass of fish in the system at its maximum (without limiting fish growth), there are three main stocking method that can help maintain this maximum.

- Sequential rearing: Multiple age groups of fish share a rearing tank, and when an age group reaches market size they are selectively harvested and replaced with the same amount of fingerlings. Downsides to this method include stressing out the entire pool of fish during each harvest, missing fish resulting in a waste of food/space, and the difficulty of keeping accurate records with frequent harvests.
- Stock splitting: Large quantities of fingerlings are stocked at once and then split into two groups once the tank hits maximum capacity, which is easier to record and eliminates fish being "forgotten". A stress-free way of doing this operation is via "swimways" that connect various rearing tanks and a series of hatches/moving screens/pumps that move the fish around.
- Multiple rearing units: Such systems usually have 2–4 tanks that share a filtration system, and when the largest tank is harvested, the other fish groups are moved up into a bigger tank whilst a new batch is started in the smallest tank. It is also common for there to be several rearing tanks yet no ways to move fish between them, which eliminates the labor of moving fish and allows each tank to be undisturbed during harvesting, even if the space usage is inefficient when the fish are fingerlings.

Ideally the bio-mass of fish in the rearing tanks doesn't exceed 0.5 lbs/gallon, in order to reduce stress from crowding, efficiently feed the fish, and promote healthy growth.

=== Disease and pest management ===
The most effective organic pesticide is Neem oil, but only in small quantities to minimize spill over fish's water.. Commercialization of aquaponics is often stalled by bottlenecks in pest and disease management. The use of chemical control methods is highly complicated for all systems. While insecticides and herbicides are replaceable by well‐established commercial biocontrol measures, fungicides and nematicides are still relevant in aquaponics. Monitoring and cultural control are the first approaches to contain pest population. Biological controls, in general, are adaptable to a larger extent. Non‐chemical prophylactic measures are highly proficient for pest and disease prevention in all designs.

Plants grown in aquaponic systems might have higher resistance to diseases compared to those grown in traditional hydroponic systems. This environment supports a diverse range of microorganisms, some of which may help protect plant roots from pathogens.

=== Automation, monitoring, and control ===
Today's technology has improved aquaponic systems. With the use of advanced sensors and IoT devices, these systems can now run with automation. This makes it possible to manage factors like nutrient levels, water usage, and lighting. Automating these processes not only makes aquaponics more efficient but can also lead to better crop yields and better use of resources.

Many have tried to create automatic control and monitoring systems and some of these demonstrated a level of success. For instance, researchers were able to introduce automation in a small scale aquaponic system to achieve a cost-effective and sustainable farming system. Commercial development of automation technologies has also emerged. For instance, a company has developed a system capable of automating the repetitive tasks of farming and features a machine learning algorithm that can automatically detect and eliminate diseased or underdeveloped plants. A 3.75-acre aquaponics facility that claims to be the first indoor salmon farm in the United States also includes an automated technology.

=== Economic viability ===
Aquaponics offers a diverse and stable polyculture system that allows farmers to grow vegetables and raise fish at the same time. By having two sources of profit, farmers can continue to earn money even if the market for either fish or plants goes through a low cycle. The flexibility of an aquaponic system allows it to grow a large variety of crops including ordinary vegetables, herbs, flowers and aquatic plants to cater to a broad spectrum of consumers. Some profitable plants for aquaponic systems include chinese cabbage, lettuce, basil, roses, tomatoes, okra, cantaloupe and bell peppers.

For environmentally conscious consumers, aquaponic products are appealing because they are organic and pesticide-free, and the systems have a relatively small environmental footprint. Aquaponic systems are also economically efficient due to their low water usage, effective nutrient cycling, and minimal land requirements. These systems can be established in areas with poor soil quality or contaminated water and require only a small amount of water. Additionally, aquaponic systems are typically free from weeds, pests, and soil-borne diseases, which allows for the consistent and rapid production of high-quality crops.

Research concerning aquaponics has focused mainly on technical facets, with a limited number of studies addressing its economic viability, particularly in commercial contexts. While aquaponics is generally deemed profitable and sustainable, the calculation of costs and the comparison of systems are rendered complex due to diverse site conditions, climatic variations, and fluctuating market prices. Energy expenses constitute a significant factor and exhibit considerable variation across countries, thereby complicating assessments of profitability. Some researchers propose that aquaponics achieves financial equilibrium after a span of two years, whereas others contend that profitability should be gauged on a per square meter basis.

The existing body of research pertaining to aquaponic systems and their economic sustainability remains considerably less extensive when compared with that of conventional hydroponic systems. Based on the research currently available, the economic viability of aquaponic enterprises must be evaluated on an individual basis. Numerous variables—including system design, seasonal climatic conditions, and local energy or land costs—play a pivotal role in determining the profitability of aquaponic ventures.

Additional research shows the support that aquaponic systems can use 14% less fertilizer than hydroponic systems. Despite this reduction, a grower should determine if the cost of maintaining aquaculture is cheaper than the use of extra fertilizer in hydroponics.

Other non-system-based barriers to the economic success of aquaponic systems could include that these systems require a high degree of knowledge in multiple disciplines, a lack of financing opportunities for aquaponics, and the fact that the general public doesn't understand what aquaponics is. An aquaponics business may require additional branding strategies compared to hydroponics, which is a technology that is relatively well known at this point in the United States.

One of the limitations of aquaponics development is the lack of commercially viable financial feasibility, considering that private companies do not share their studies with the public.

== Current examples ==
=== Europe ===
- In March 2018, the European Aquaponics Association was established among European countries. This opened up an organization for European countries to continue aquaponic research and the implementation of aquaponic practices.

=== Asia ===
- In Bangladesh, one of the most densely populated countries, most farmers use agrochemicals to enhance food production and storage life, though the country lacks oversight on safe levels of chemicals in foods for human consumption. To combat this issue, a team led by M.A. Salam at the Department of Aquaculture of Bangladesh Agricultural University has created plans for a low-cost aquaponics system to provide organic produce and fish for people living in adverse climatic conditions such as the salinity-prone southern area and the flood-prone haor area in the eastern region. Salam's work innovates a form of subsistence farming for micro-production goals at the community and personal levels.
- An aquaponic gardening system is developed for use on rooftops in Gaza City.

=== North America ===
- Dakota College at Bottineau in Bottineau, North Dakota has an aquaponics program that gives students the ability to obtain a certificate or an AAS degree in aquaponics.
- The Smith Road facility in Denver started an aquaponics program to feed 800 to 1,000 inmates at the Denver Jail, and a neighboring downtown facility which consists of 1,500 inmates and 700 officers.
- Volunteer operation in Nicaragua "Amigos for Christ" manages its plantation for feeding 900+ poverty-stricken school children by using nutrients from aquaponic methods.
- There has been a shift towards community integration of aquaponics, such as the nonprofit foundation Growing Power that offers Milwaukee youth job opportunities and training while growing food for their community. The model has spawned several satellite projects in other cities, such as New Orleans where the Vietnamese fisherman community has suffered from the Deepwater Horizon oil spill, and in the South Bronx in New York City.
- Whispering Roots is a non-profit organization in Omaha, Nebraska that provides fresh, locally grown, healthy food for socially and economically disadvantaged communities by using aquaponics, hydroponics and urban farming.
- Recently, aquaponics has been moving towards indoor production systems. In cities like Chicago, entrepreneurs are utilizing vertical designs to grow food year round. These systems can be used to grow food year round with minimal to no waste.

=== Caribbean ===
- The Caribbean island of Barbados created an initiative to start aquaponics systems at home, called the aquaponic machine, with revenue generated by selling produce to tourists in an effort to reduce growing dependence on imported food.

Aquaponic gardeners from all around the world are gathering in online community sites and forums to share their experiences and promote the development of this form of gardening, as well as creating extensive resources on how to build home systems.

There are various modular systems made for the public that utilize aquaponic systems to produce organic vegetables and herbs, and provide indoor decor at the same time. These systems can serve as a source of herbs and vegetables indoors. Universities are promoting research on these modular systems as they get more popular among city dwellers.

== See also ==
- Rice-fish system
- Integrated multi-trophic aquaculture
- Vertical farming
