= Erika Allen =

American businesswoman

- Education: School of the Art Institute of Chicago; University of Illinois Chicago
- Occupation: CEO of Urban Growers Collective

Erika Allen is the co-founder and CEO of Urban Growers Collective. In 2022, she won the 2022 James Beard Leadership Award.

== Biography ==
Allen received her BA from the School of the Art Institute of Chicago and from the University of Illinois Chicago, a MA in art psychotherapy. From the same university, she received an Honorary Ph.D. in Public Health.

== Career ==
From 2012 until 2017, Allen was Commissioner of Chicago Park District. She serves on the Chicago Food Policy Action Council and on J. B. Pritzker's team for Agriculture.

== Personal life ==
Will Allen, former professional basketball player and CEO of Growing Power, is her father.
