= Growing Power =

Defunct American agriculture organization

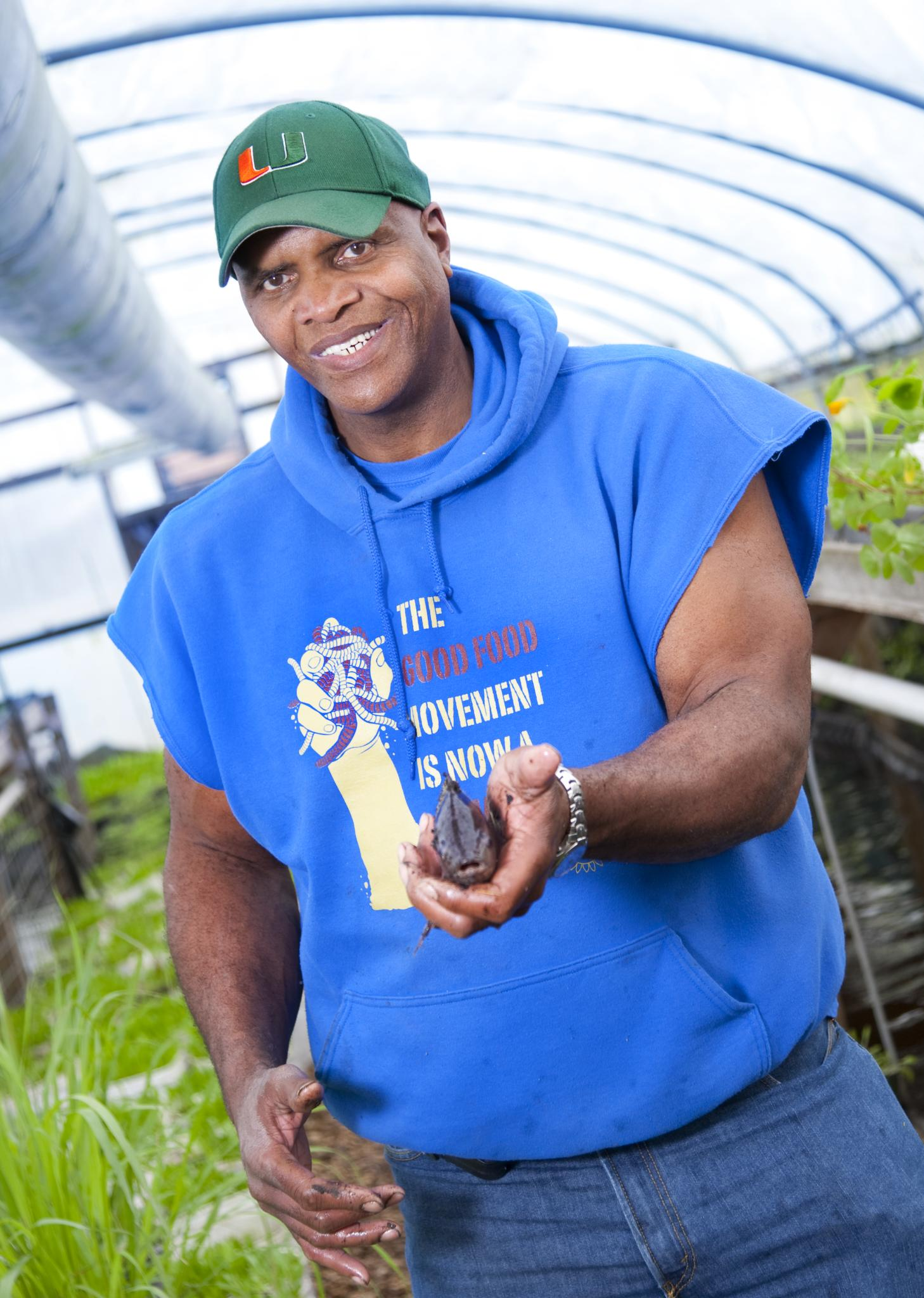
CEO Will Allen in one of his greenhouses (2011)

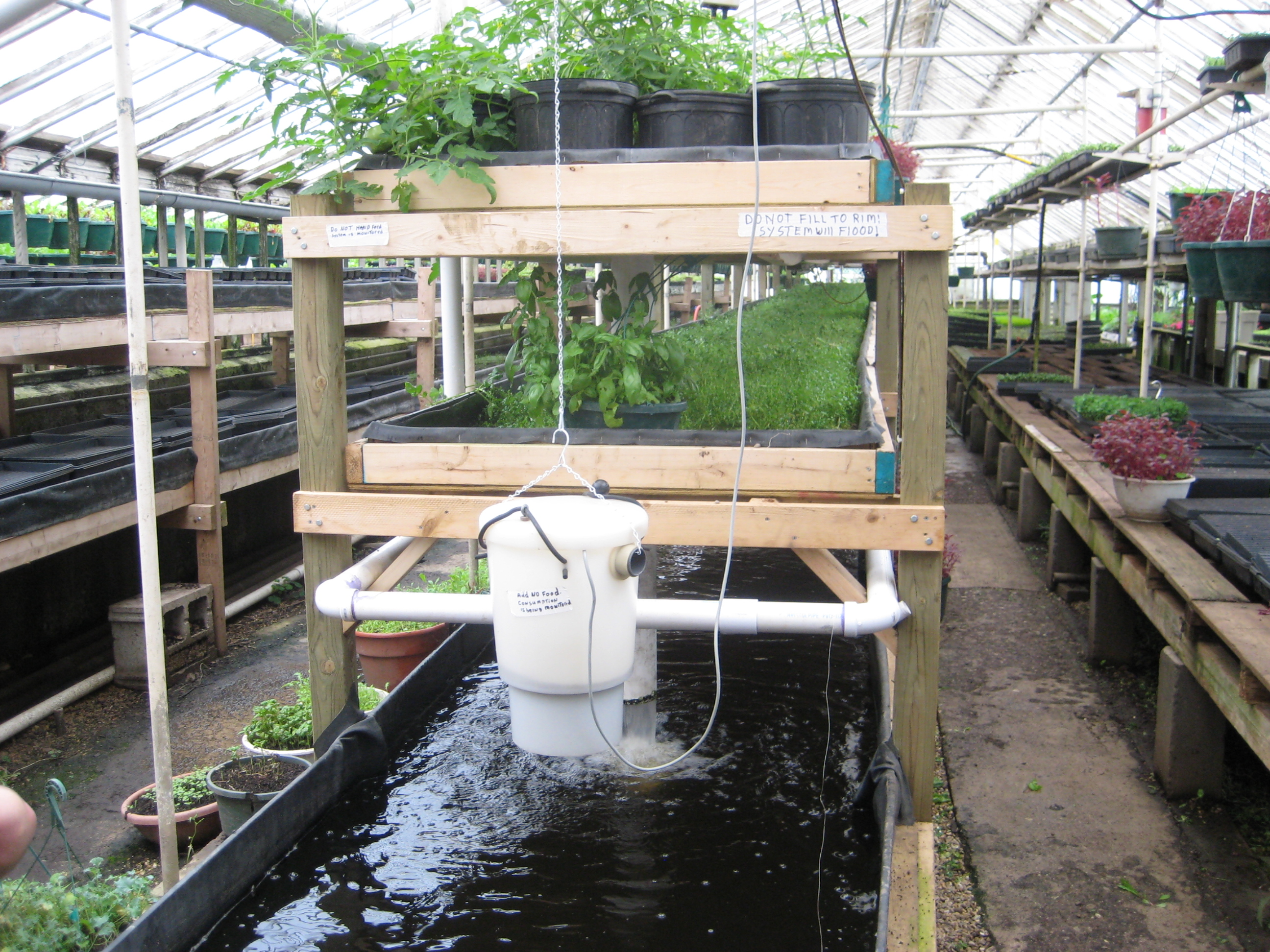
Growing Power's aquaponics system

Growing Power was an urban agriculture organization headquartered in Milwaukee, Wisconsin. It ran the last functional farm within the Milwaukee city limits and also maintained an active office in Chicago. Growing Power aimed for sustainable food production, as well as the growth of communities through the creation of local gardens and Community Food Systems. They implemented their mission by providing hands-on training, on-the-ground demonstration, outreach and technical assistance.

Its facilities included seven large greenhouses, a kitchen, indoor and outdoor training gardens, aquaculture system and a food distribution facility. Fish, worms, bees, goats, chickens, turkeys, and ducks were also raised there. Growing Power conducted workshops and demonstrations in aquaculture, aquaponics, vermiculture, horticulture, small or large-scale composting, soil reclamation, food distribution, beekeeping, and marketing. It also ran numerous collaborative projects and training projects, including a partnership with the Boys and Girls Club of Greater Milwaukee to train city youth in gardening, in addition to hosting interns year-round.

The farm grew a wide variety of fruit and vegetables, and also farmed tilapia and perch through the use of aquaponics. Thousands of people toured the facilities every year.

Growing Power was started by Will Allen, who bought the Milwaukee farm in 1993. Allen, a former professional basketball player, grew up on a farm in Maryland. In 2008, he was awarded a MacArthur Foundation "Genius Grant" for his work on urban farming, sustainable food production and with Growing Power.

Despite the organization's successes in attracting attention to urban agriculture and community food systems causes, Growing Power was unable to attain financial self-sufficiency. Facing mounting debts and legal challenges, in November 2017 Growing Power's board of directors voted to dissolve the organization. Following the dissolution of Growing Power, the leadership team of its Chicago branch formed the nonprofit Urban Growers Collective, to "continue the legacy of Growing Power." The Urban Grower's Collective was co-founded by Will Allen's daughter, Erika Allen.
