= Integrated Aqua-Vegeculture System =

Gardening technique

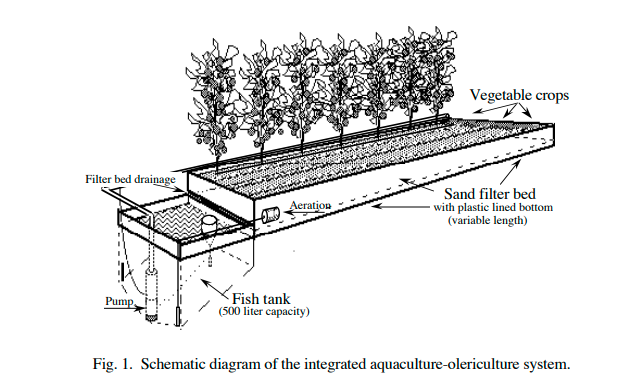
iAVs schematic diagram

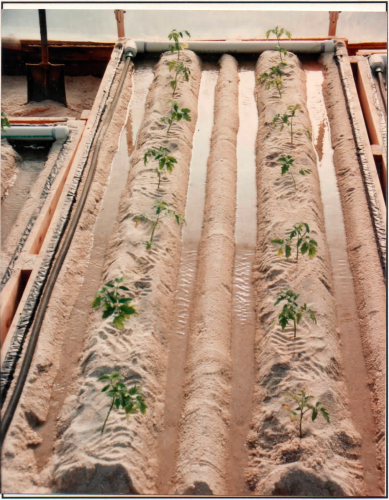
Tomato transplants in a biofilter (composed of sand, bacteria and plants) shown being irrigated with aquacultural water for the first time.

The Integrated Aqua-Vegeculture System (iAVs), often mistakenly referred to as Sandponics, is a food production method that combines aquaculture and horticulture (olericulture). It was developed in the 1980s by Mark McMurtry and colleagues at North Carolina State University including Doug Sanders, Paul V. Nelson and Merle Jensen.

In an iAVs, fish are raised in tanks, and their nutrient-rich water irrigates and fertilizes sand-based grow beds that support plant growth, act as biofilters, and deliver nutrients. As plants and micro-flora absorb these nutrients, they purify the water, which is recirculated back to the fish tanks.

The system often includes an aeration device, such as an aerating cascade, to oxygenate the water before it returns to the fish tanks. This multi-functional use of sand beds contributes to the relative simplicity of the iAVs design compared to other aquaponic systems.

== History ==
=== Development and early research ===
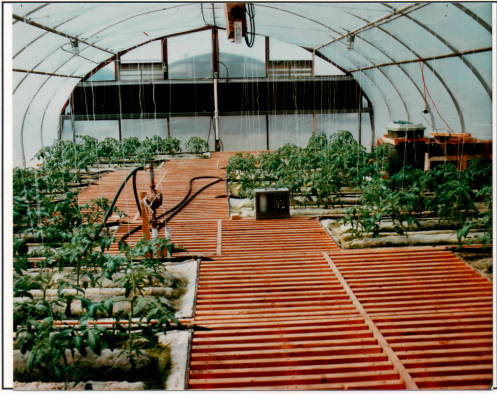
View of the research greenhouse approximately one week after transplant of tomato crop. The tanks are below the wood-grate walkway

Aquaponic systems were in use among the Aztecs in Mexico ca. 1000AD, and such a system was replicated in the US in 1969, when research into those systems began, with researchers from the New Alchemy Institute in Massachusetts and from North Carolina State University leading the way. Mark McMurtry, along with Doug Sanders, Paul V. Nelson, and Merle Jensen, pioneered the iAVs at North Carolina State University. The system was designed to address issues such as soil infertility, pollution, and water scarcity, which McMurtry observed during his time in Africa. The initial research aimed to create a sustainable and efficient method for producing nutrient-rich food while conserving water.

=== Modification and commercialization ===
In the early 1990s, Tom and Paula Speraneo, owners of S & S AquaFarm in Missouri, adapted the iAVs design by replacing sand with gravel and using above-ground tanks for fish. This modified system, known as "Speraneo Systems," employed bell siphons to facilitate an ebb-and-flow irrigation cycle, popularizing what is commonly termed flood and drain aquaponics. In 2005, Joel Malcolm purchased the Speraneo’s information kit and adapted it for use in Australia. The Australian Broadcasting Corporation's Gardening TV program featured Malcolm's home-based system, leading to a renewed interest in the basic flood and drain system.

The introduction of gravel in aquaponics brought about several significant changes. It reduced mechanical filtration capability, decreased populations and activity of soil organisms, and lowered aeration in the media bacteria and plant root zone. Additionally, it diminished nutrient utilization and system stability, leading to reduced fish survival, feed rate, and growth. These changes also resulted in increased capital costs with lower fish and plant yields, as well as higher operating costs per unit of production.

== Horticultural subsystem ==
The upper surface of the plant/filter bed is prepared to a level grade and designed to accommodate the specific vegetable crops or species to be cultivated. Irrigation furrows are created between the rows of plants to promote the uniform distribution of irrigation water across the surface and through the volume of the filter bed. The plants are grown in raised sections of the sand which ensures the crown of the plants are kept dry.

In the Integrated Aqua Vegeculture System (iAVs), plants are grown in a horticulture subsystem where their roots are embedded in sand. This sand acts as a filtration medium, allowing the plants to absorb the nutrient-rich effluent water from the aquaculture subsystem. The plants effectively filter out ammonia and its metabolites, which are toxic to the aquatic animals. After the water has passed through the horticulture subsystem, it is cleaned and oxygenated, making it suitable to return to the aquaculture vessels. It uses a method of intermittent irrigation, flooding the furrows of the beds every 2 hours, during the day, until the sand is saturated. There is no irrigation at night,

== Terminology ==
Historically, aquaponics, which combines aquaculture (fish farming) and hydroponics (growing plants in water), was only seen as relating to these two practices, making current connections to traditional soil-based farming seem out of place.

The Integrated Aqua-Vegeculture System (iAVs), developed by Dr. Mark McMurtry prior to the popularization of the term "aquaponics," represents a specialized methodology within the broader domain of aquaponics.

Hydroponics is traditionally understood as a soil-less cultivation method utilizing nutrient solutions, which can create confusion when discussing systems like iAVs that incorporate soil. This distinction emphasizes the unique methodology of iAVs as compared to other aquaponic systems, which generally do not utilize sand.

The ongoing dialogues surrounding the definitions of aquaponics and hydroponics highlight the necessity for standardized terminology in this field. Without clear definitions, the scientific advancement of aquaponics, including iAVs, may be impeded, as researchers and practitioners might struggle to communicate their findings and innovations effectively.

Additionally, this semantic challenge can influence public perception and the adoption of these systems, leading to potential confusion regarding the functionalities and requirements of various aquaponic setups. Establishing standardized terminology for describing aquaponic systems, including iAVs, will facilitate clearer communication, promote scientific progress, and enhance public understanding and support for these agricultural technologies.
