= Will Allen (urban farmer) =

American basketball player and urban farmer

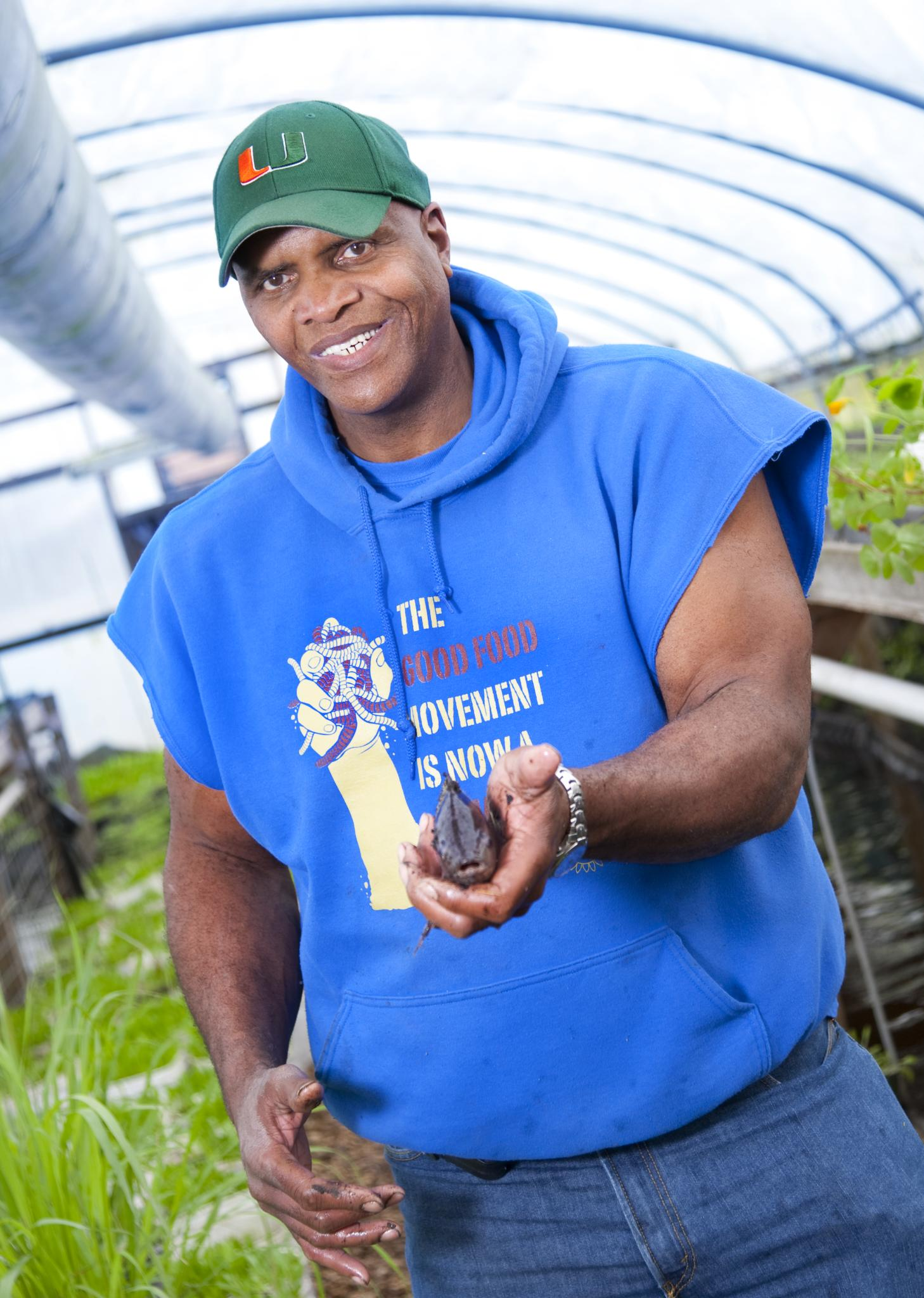
- Allen holds a tilapia in his hand at the urban farm Growing Power
- Born: February 8, 1949 (age 77); Rockville, Maryland, U.S.
- Education: University of Miami, B.A. Physical Education (1971); University of Wisconsin–Milwaukee, Honorary Ph.D. Agriculture (2012)
- Occupation: Chief Executive Officer
- Known for: Urban farming, Professional basketball
- Height: 6 ft 7 in (201 cm)
- Children: Erika, Jason, Randall, Adrianna
- Awards: 2008 MacArthur Fellowship, Genius Award

Will Allen (born February 8, 1949) is an American urban farmer based in Milwaukee and a retired professional basketball player.

== Early life and education ==
Will Allen was a high school state champion in basketball at Richard Montgomery High School in Rockville, Maryland Allen played collegiately for the Miami Hurricanes at the University of Miami, where he was on a basketball scholarship. He was the first African-American to play basketball for the University of Miami.

== Career ==
After college Allen was selected by the Baltimore Bullets in the 4th round (60th pick overall) of the 1971 NBA draft. He never played in the NBA, but appeared in seven games with The Floridians of the ABA during the 1971–72 season. He also played professionally in Belgium.

Allen retired from basketball in 1977, when he was 28. Upon retirement, Allen moved to his wife Cynthia's hometown of Milwaukee, Wisconsin.

=== Urban farming ===
Will Allen's parents were sharecroppers in South Carolina until they took part in the Great Migration and moved to Rockville, Maryland, where Allen grew up.

Finishing a career in marketing, Allen left a job at Procter & Gamble in 1993 and purchased a derelict plant nursery that was in foreclosure, located on the north side of Milwaukee. Around this time, Allen also purchased a 100-acre farm in Oak Creek, previously owned by his wife's parents.

Allen became the director of Growing Power, an urban farming project in Milwaukee, with a 40-acre farm west of Milwaukee in the town of Merton and an offshoot project in Chicago run by Allen's daughter, Erika. Under increasing debt after two decades of operation, the nonprofit discontinued in 2017. Allen remains active on the site in north Milwaukee through his company Will Allen Farms, LLC.

In 2005, Allen was awarded a Ford Foundation leadership grant on behalf of his urban farming work. In 2008, he was awarded the MacArthur Foundation "Genius Grant" for his work on urban farming and sustainable food production. In 2009, the Kellogg Foundation gave Allen a grant to create jobs in urban agriculture.

Will Allen appears in the documentary film, Fresh. The film refers to Allen as "one of the most influential leaders of the food security and urban farming movement."

Will Allen is the co-author, with Charles Wilson, of the book The Good Food Revolution: Growing Healthy Food, People and Communities, published by Gotham Books, a member of Penguin Group, USA. The book was nominated for a 2013 NAACP Image Award in the category of biography/autobiography. Allen is also the subject of 2014's Farmer Will Allen & the Growing Table, written by Jacqueline Briggs Martin and illustrated by Eric-Shabazz Larkin.

On May 20, 2012, Allen was awarded an honorary Doctor of Agriculture degree from the University of Wisconsin–Milwaukee. He also delivered the commencement address for the graduation ceremony held on that day.

== See also ==
- Growing Power
