= 1867 English cricket season =

Cricket season review

The 1867 English cricket season was the fourth since the legalisation of overarm bowling. Yorkshire achieved a perfect season in first-class cricket, something not likely to be equalled on covered pitches due to the high frequency of drawn matches, and even beforehand much more difficult due to the increased scoring after 1870, produced by the usage of a heavy roller and the disappearance of the abundant shooters, which previously made batting very tough.

The season is, however, best known for a schism between the northern and southern professionals that led to the North v South game, one of the major "representative" fixtures of the time, being suspended for several years because northern professionals refused to play in London for want of better conditions. (Note: Some eleven-a-side matches played from 1772 to 1863 have been rated "first-class" by certain sources. However, the term only came into common use around 1864, when overarm bowling was legalised. It was formally defined as a standard by a meeting at Lord's, in May 1894, of Marylebone Cricket Club (MCC) and the county clubs which were then competing in the County Championship. The ruling was effective from the beginning of the 1895 season, but pre-1895 matches of the same standard have no official definition of status because the ruling is not retrospective. Matches of a similar standard since the beginning of the 1864 season are generally considered to have an unofficial first-class status. Pre-1864 matches which are included in the ACS' "Important Match Guide" may generally be regarded as top-class or, at least, historically significant. For further information, see First-class cricket.)

== Events ==
- 30 May: In the first county match of the season, James Ricketts, on his first-class debut, scores 195 not out. At the time it was the highest score in purely county cricket, and it was the highest score by a batsman on debut in first-class cricket between Tom Marsden's 227 in 1826 and Norman Callaway scoring 207 in his sole first-class match in February 1915.
- 13 June: Charles Robertson Young becomes the youngest to play first-class cricket in England until Barney Gibson in 2011 when he played for Hampshire against Kent at fifteen years 131 days
- A schism between the northern professionals (Yorkshire, Nottinghamshire and Cambridgeshire) and their southern counterparts, led by veteran batsman George Parr, who demanded improved remuneration and guaranteed benefits for their services, dominated the season. This schism, which had roots dating back to 1864, meant that in 1867 and 1868:
1. the annual match between the All England Eleven and the United All England Eleven, which had been played since 1857 in London was played very early in the season at Old Trafford - then in its infancy as a first-class venue - then permanently cancelled. The United All England Eleven later divided into the "United North of England Eleven" and "United South of England Eleven", with the latter being dominated by W. G. Grace.
2. the northern professionals were not seen at Lord's or The Oval and the Players' elevens for the two annual Gentlemen v Players games in London was composed of Surrey and Marylebone players only, and their attraction to the public was materially reduced
3. the North v South game was replaced by "North of the Thames v South of the Thames"
- Yorkshire County Cricket Club won all seven of its matches played. Except for Sussex in 1871 and Lancashire in 1872, who both played only four games against weak opponents, no county since has equalled this "perfect season", though Gloucestershire in 1877 came within one wicket of doing so and Nottinghamshire in 1884 within three. Since the official County Championship began in 1890, the nearest approaches to winning every game have been:
1. Surrey in 1892 with thirteen wins, two losses and a draw in sixteen games
2. Surrey in 1894 with thirteen wins, two losses and a tie in sixteen games
3. Nottinghamshire in 1907 with fifteen wins, four draws and one abandoned game in a twenty-game schedule
4. Surrey in 1955 with 23 wins and five losses in a twenty-eight game schedule
5. Warwickshire in 1995 with fourteen wins, two losses and one draw in seventeen games

== Playing record (by county) ==
County	Played	Won	Lost	Drawn
Cambridgeshire	4	1	3	0
Hampshire	3	0	2	1
Kent	8	3	3	2
Lancashire	5	0	3	2
Middlesex	4	0	3	1
Nottinghamshire	4	3	1	0
Surrey	10	3	3	4
Sussex	5	3	2	0
Yorkshire	7	7	0	0

== Leading batsmen (qualification 10 innings) ==
1867 English season leading batsmen
Name	Team	Matches	Innings	Not outs	Runs	Highest score	Average	100s	50s
Richard Daft	Nottinghamshire; All England Eleven	6	12	6	377	111 not out	53.85	1	2
George Lyttelton	Cambridge University	6	10	1	341	114	37.88	1	1
Roger Iddison	Lancashire; Yorkshire	10	17	3	460	71 not out	32.85	0	4
Bransby Cooper	Marylebone Cricket Club (MCC); Middlesex	6	10	1	288	86	32.00	0	2
Tom Hayward senior	Cambridgeshire; All England Eleven	7	13	3	300	55 not out	30.00	0	2

== Leading bowlers (qualification 800 balls) ==
1867 English season leading bowlers
Name	Team	Balls bowled	Runs conceded	Wickets taken	Average	Best bowling	5 wickets in innings	10 wickets in match
Tom Emmett	Yorkshire	954	368	48	7.66	6/7	7	2
George Freeman	Yorkshire	2255	552	66	8.36	7/10	7	2
George Tarrant	Cambridgeshire	1380	383	44	8.70	7/33	5	2
Luke Greenwood	Yorkshire	1211	368	34	10.82	8/35	4	1
George Wootton	Marylebone Cricket Club (MCC); Nottinghamshire	4950	1644	142	11.57	8/15	16	6

== Bibliography ==
- ACS (1981). A Guide to Important Cricket Matches Played in the British Isles 1709–1863. Nottingham: ACS. OCLC 85045528.
- ACS (1982). A Guide to First-class Cricket Matches Played in the British Isles. Nottingham: ACS. OCLC 10586869.
- Warner, Pelham (1946). Lords: 1787–1945. London: Harrap. OCLC 877106024.

== Annual reviews ==
- John Lillywhite's Cricketer's Companion (Green Lilly), Lillywhite, 1868
- Wisden Cricketers' Almanack, 1868
