= Stale seed bed =

Gardening tactic

The stale seed bed or false seed bed method is a weed control technique used at both the farm and garden scales. In this that the young weeds can then be easily eliminated. By destroying them early, the farmer or gardener eliminates most of that season's annual weeds, which reduces their labor and improves their crop yields.

== Description ==
The stale seed bed technique of weed control was developed before herbicide use began. It reduces the soil's seed bank or quantity by allowing the weed seeds both opportunity and time to germinate, sprout, and appear before the intended crop is planted. Once the weeds appear, they are easily eliminated by various methods that minimize further soil disturbance. This cycle can be repeated numerous times before planting the crop. Early reduction of the weed seed quantity by this method reduces the need to weed for the rest of the growing season, and in some cases performs as well as chemical weed control methods.

== Method ==
The false or stale seed bed technique can be started immediately after harvesting a field, or at least two weeks prior to planting a new crop.

=== Farm-scale Approach ===
The farm field should be worked and smoothed into a flat fine seed bed. The initial tillage is normally done with a disc harrow or a rotary tiller, rather than with a plow. If plowing is required, secondary passes with a disc or tiller will be needed. The next step is to break up clods and flatten the surface is done with a spring-tooth or spike-tooth harrow, or with a chain drag harrow, depending on the soil type. Final preparation is done with a cultipacker or other type of roller to firm the soil, which enhances seed germination.

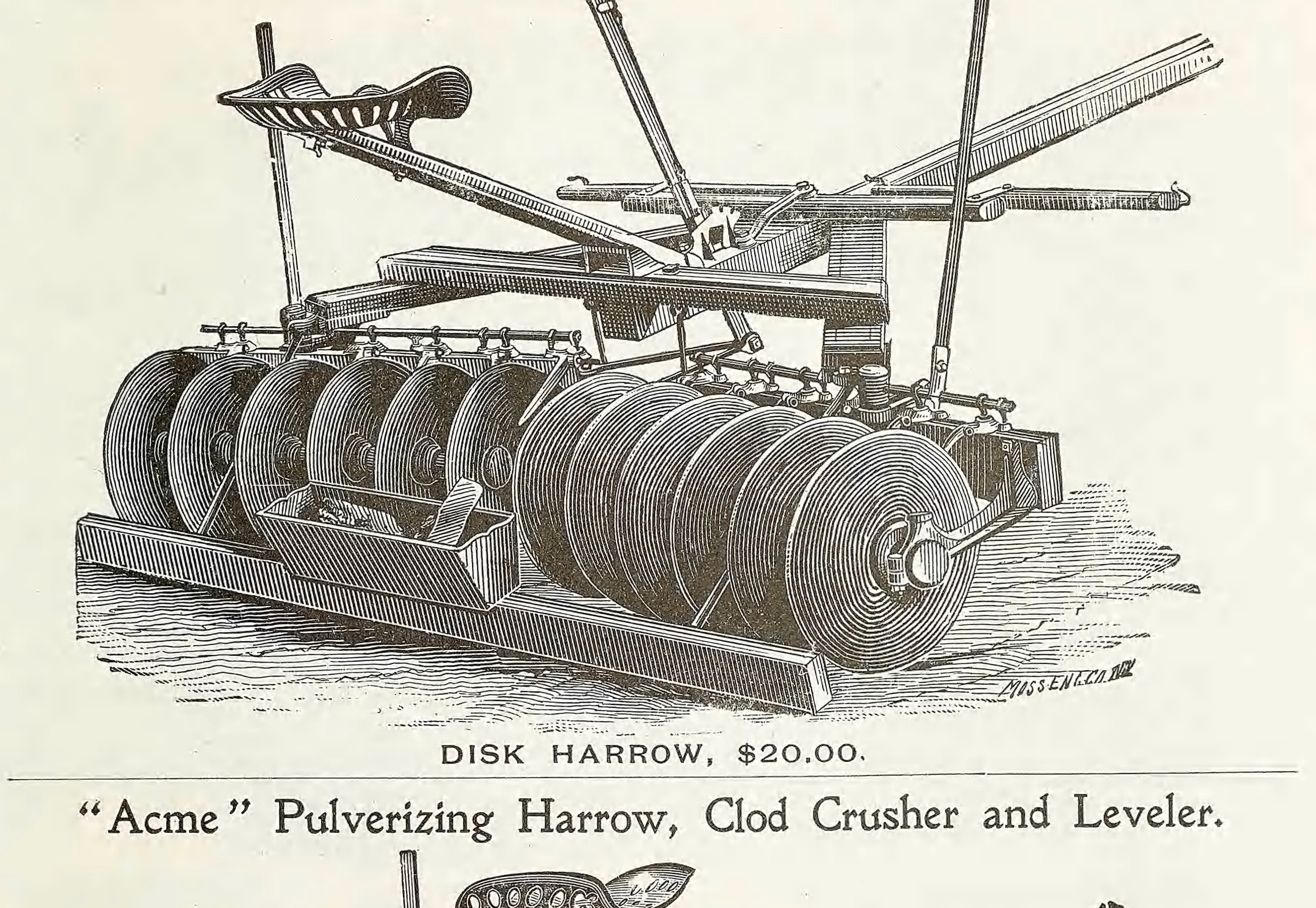
Annual catalogue (1868) (18397480316)

After the weeds have sprouted and reached the first-leaf stage, they are eliminated. This is done with by either mechanical or thermal means.

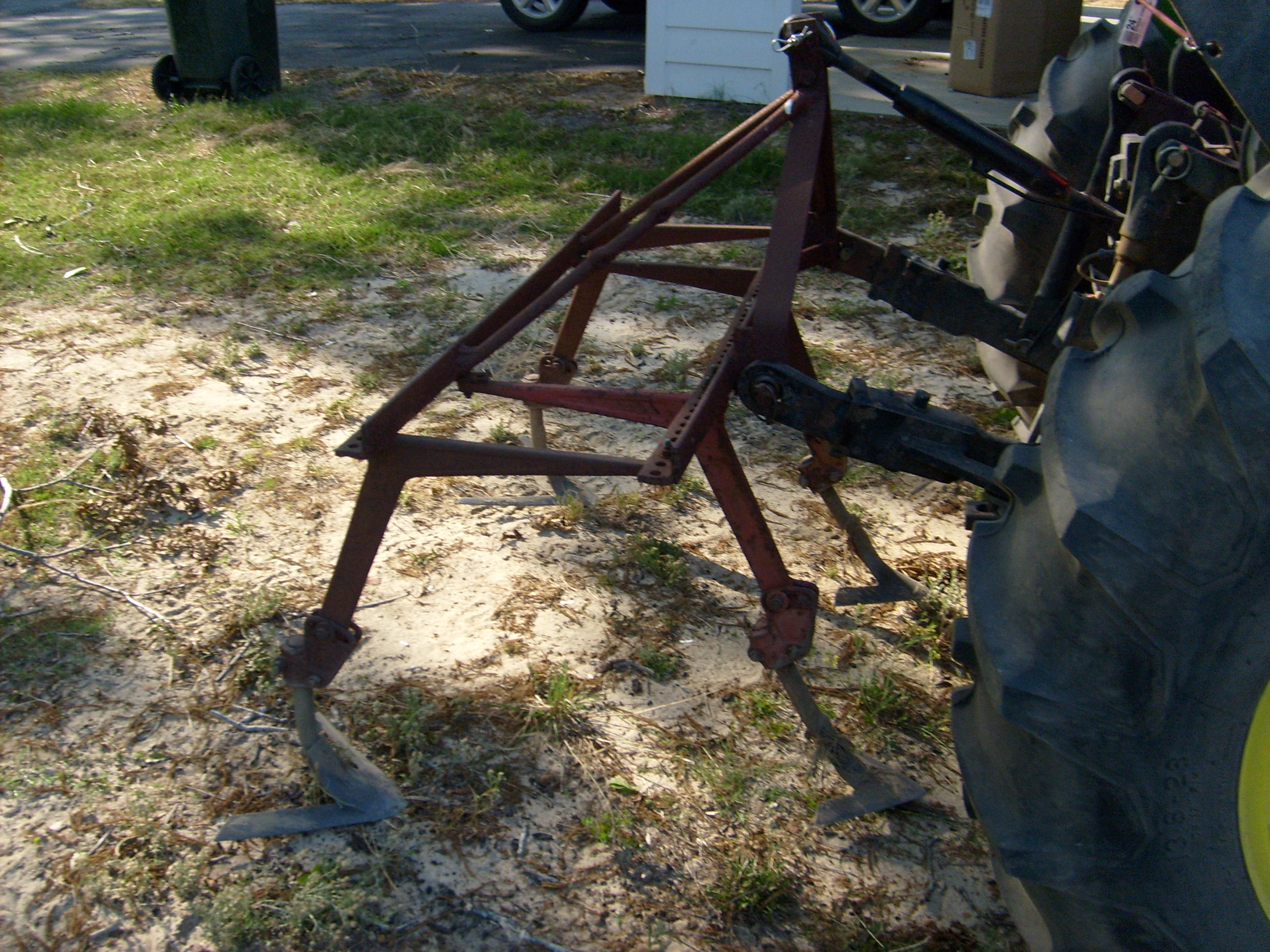
Sweep cultivator on the back of a John Deere 5220 tractor

- Mechanical elimination of these small weed seedlings is done by stirring the surface of the soil to uproot and bury the seedlings. The most commonly used implement is a field cultivator fitted with sweeps. Either duckfoot sweeps and blade sweeps (beet knife) can be used, but must be set for a very shallow depth of cut. The other implement that can be used is a chain harrow or drag harrow.
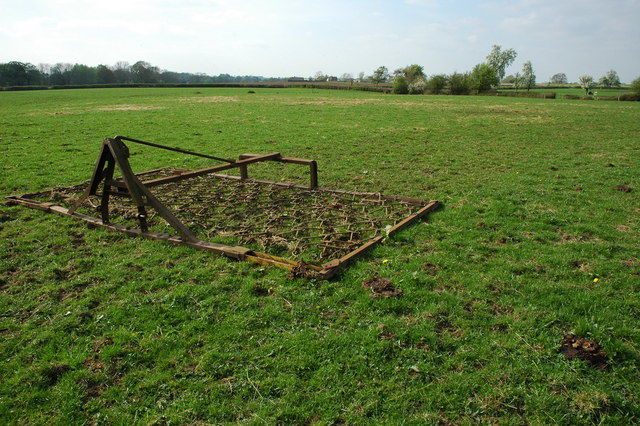
  Chain Harrows at Okle Clifford - geograph.org.uk - 1274415
- Thermal elimination of the small weed seedlings is done with a flame weeder. This method has the added advantage of not disturbing the soil at all. Flame weeding uses propane to very briefly expose the seedlings to flame and intense heat. It does not burn the plant, but instead causes denaturing of the cell membranes and subsequent dehydration. A flame weeder implement is normally a trailer that is light enough to be pulled through the field by either a tractor or a pickup truck.

In many cases, several cycles of cultivatortilling and weeding are done, often at 2 week intervals. This allows more and more weed seeds to germinate and be removed. Repetition eliminates more weeds, but care must be used to not delay planting of a desirable crop later than the crop needs for a successful season's growth. After several years, most, if not all, weeds can be eliminated from the seed bank in the soil.

=== Garden-scale Approach ===
The stale seed bed method can easily be used in the garden. The timing and steps are the same as described for a farm-scale operation, but the equipment used is different. Rather than repeat the description of the steps detailed above, the equipment changes will be noted here.

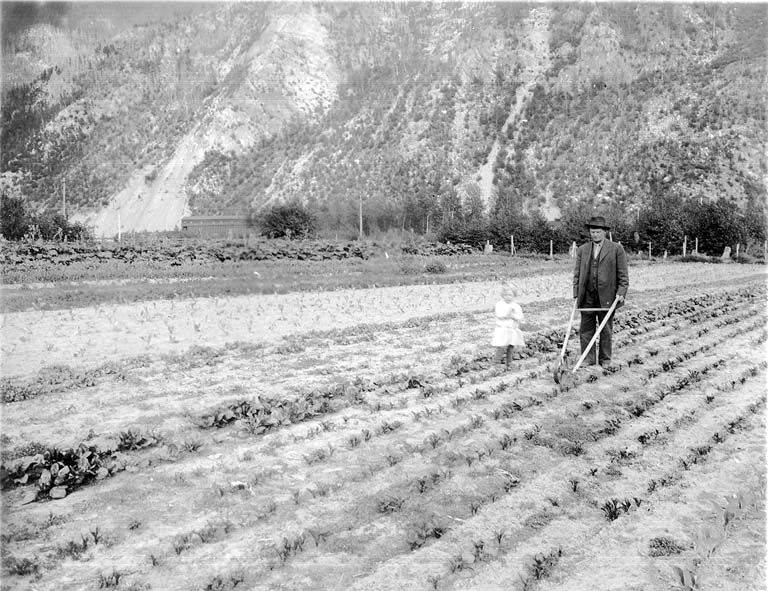
Mr Clark using wheel cultivator on his farm as his daughter watches, Skagway, ca 1914 (CURTIS 1948)

Initial tillage in the garden can be done by spading with a shovel or spade, cultivating with a wheel cultivator, or by tilling with grub hoe or a rototiller. The soil should only be worked deep enough to kill existing plants and loosen enough soil to create a seed bed. The garden tillage depth is normally about 4 inches, with a maximum of 6 inches.

Seed bed finishing can be done with a heavy garden rake to break up clods and level the soil. Lightly rolling, tamping, or compacting the soil surface will increase germination. The garden can also be watered to speed up germination of the weeds.

After the weeds have sprouted and reached the first-leaf stage, they are eliminated using mechanical or thermal methods as above.

Mechanical elimination of small weed seedlings in the garden is done by stirring the surface of the soil to uproot and bury the seedlings. This can be done with a long-handled hoe that only works at the surface of the soil, such as a light draw hoe, a stirrup hoe, or a scuffle hoe. Weeding can also be done with a wheel hoe outfitted with sweeps.

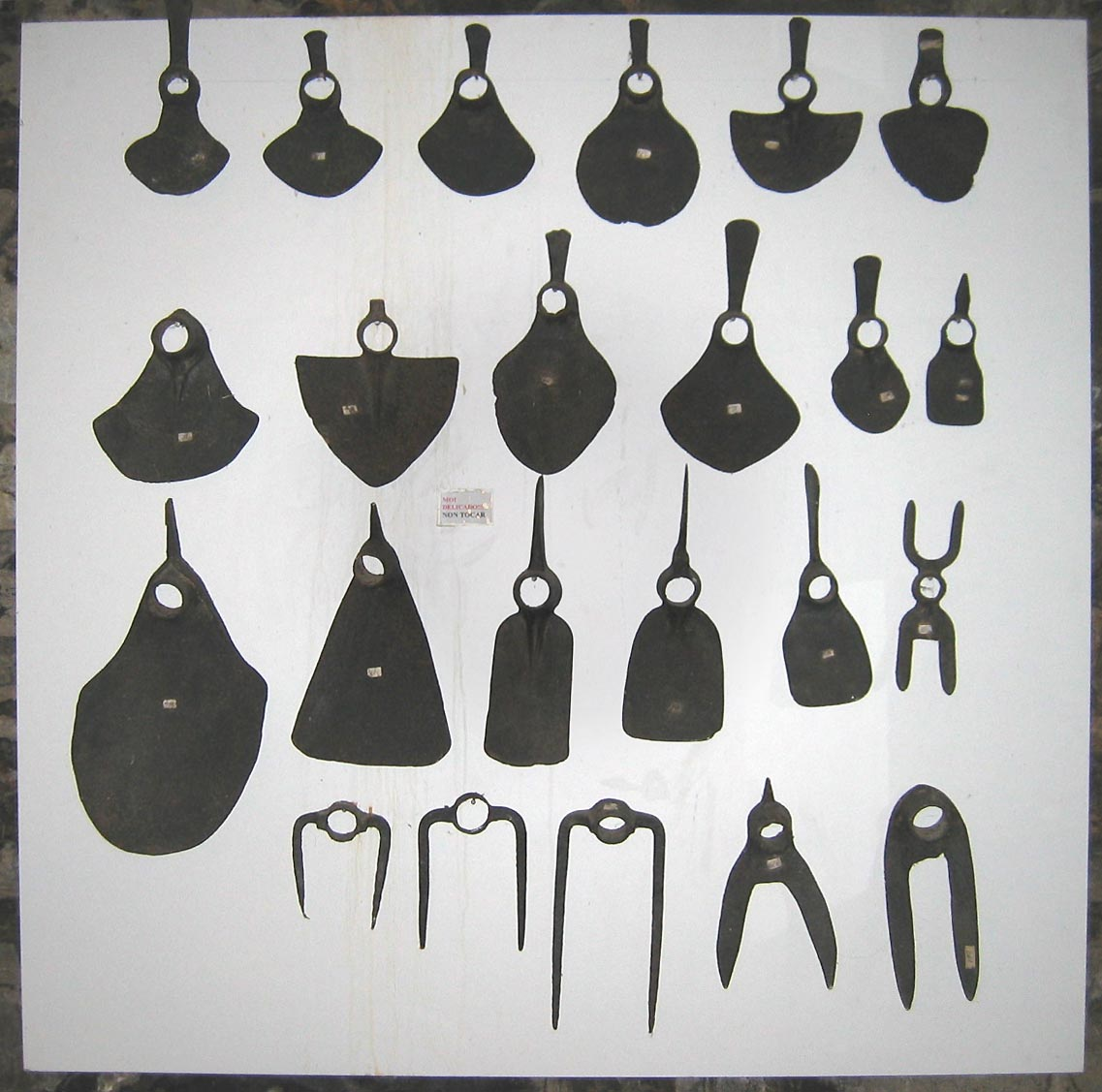
Sachos e picarañas

Thermal destruction of the small weed seedlings can be done with a flame weeder, which does not disturb the soil at all. There are both hand-held units for small gardens, and wheeled versions for larger gardens.

=== No-Till Approach ===
A no-till approach to creating a stale seed bed is usually done on large commercial garden beds or in home gardens. It skips the soil tillage steps, but may involve removing enough plant residue to avoid problems with the tarps. The no-till stale seed bed method involves covering the soil with plastic or silage tarps.

There are two basic strategies: soil solarization and soil occultation. With soil solarization, the seed bed is covered with a clear plastic sheet which heats the soil to a temperature that kills pests, pathogens, and weeds. With occultation, black plastic or silage tarps are laid over the soil, creating a moist and warm environment in which weed seeds germinate, and then die due to lack of light. In either case, the seedbed is prepared and moistened prior to covering with the plastic or tarp.
