= Spring-tooth harrow =

Tillage machine

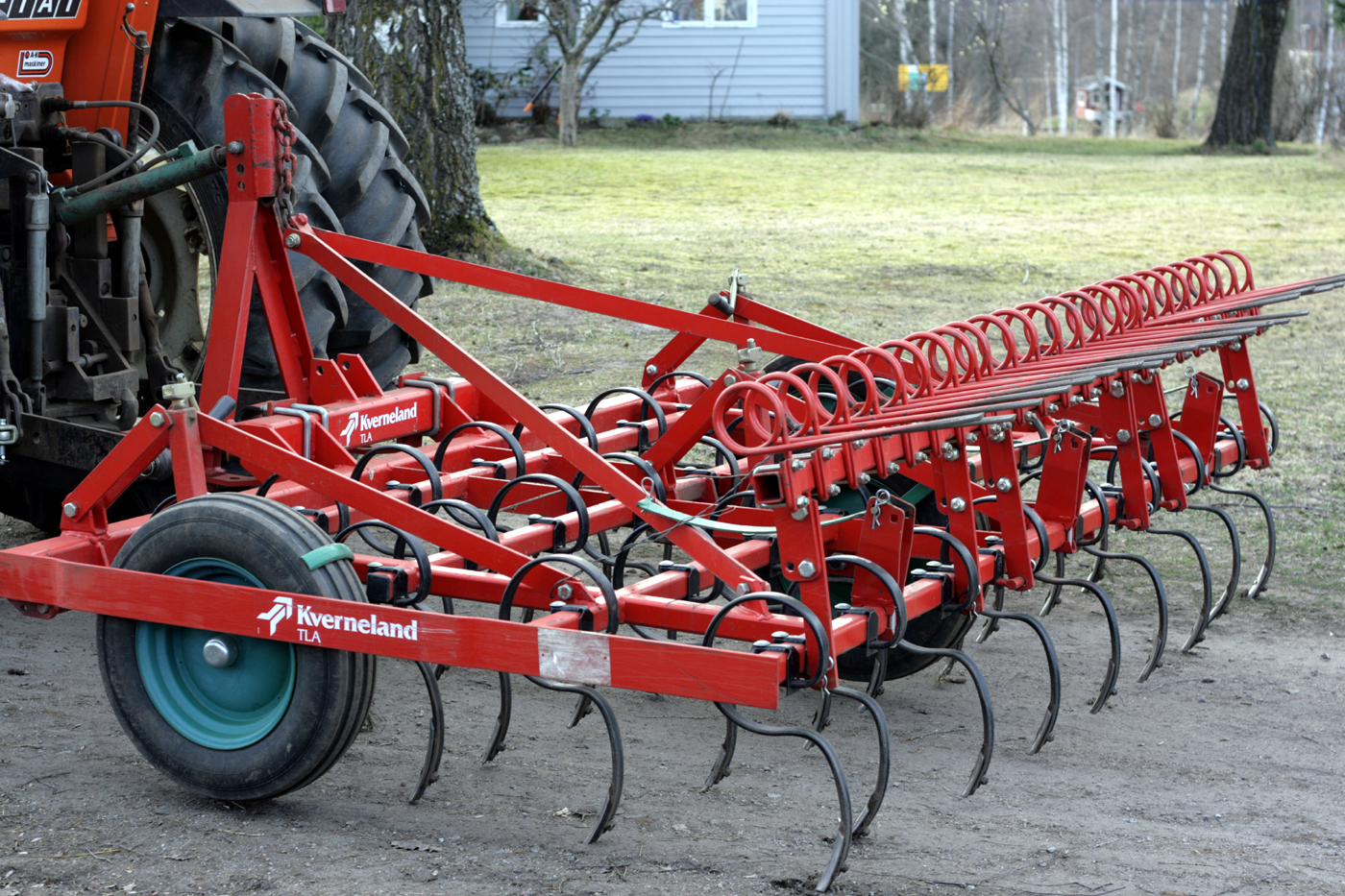
Modern Kverneland spring-tooth harrow

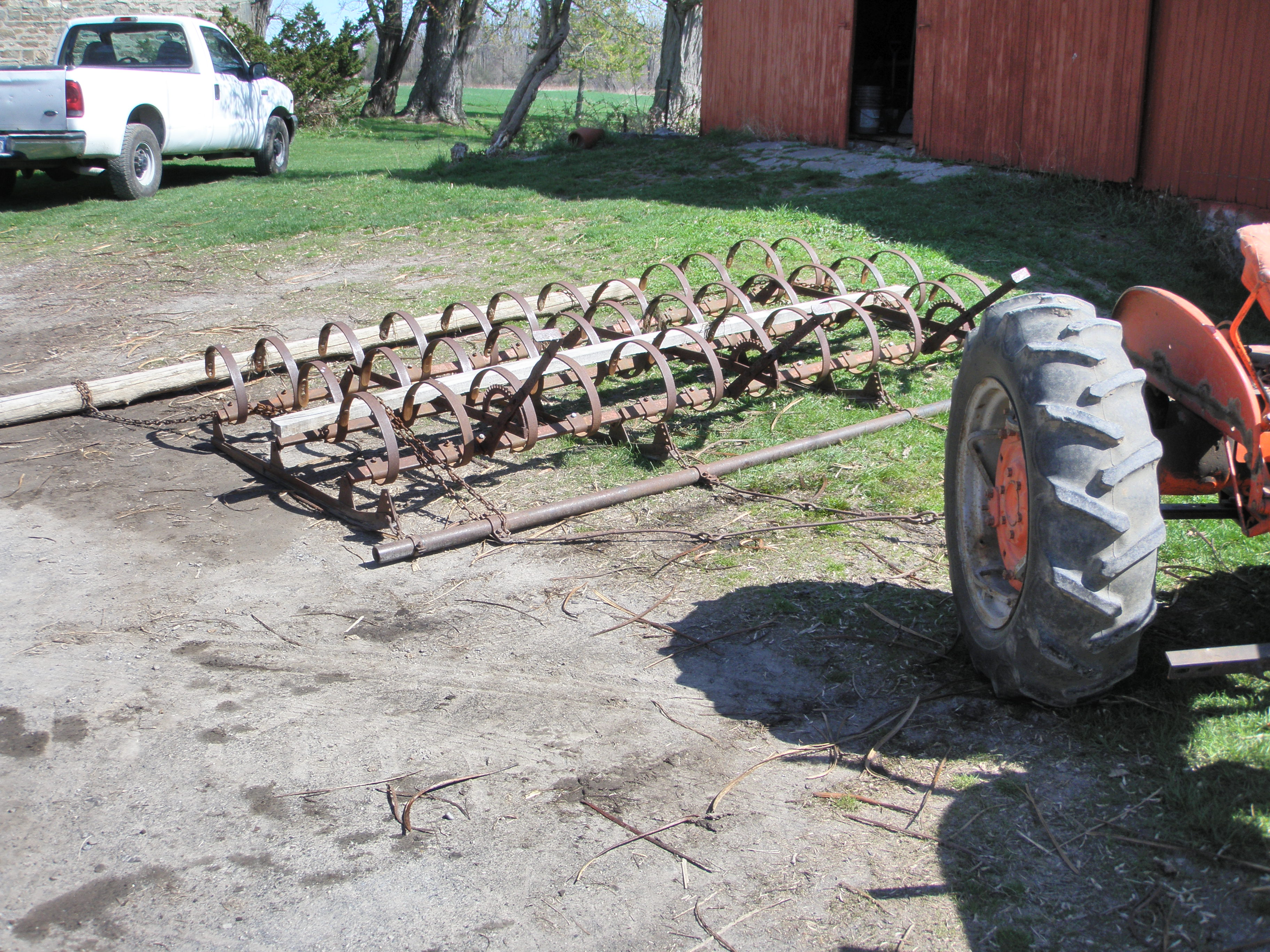
A 12-foot traditional style spring tooth harrow. Note how it is in four foot sections with manual levers to adjust the depth of tillage.

A spring-tooth harrow is a type of harrow, and specifically a type of tine harrow. It uses many flexible iron teeth mounted in rows to loosen the soil before planting.

A drag harrow more specifically refers to a largely outdated type of soil cultivation implement that is used to smooth the ground as well as loosen it after it has been plowed and packed. It uses many flexible iron teeth usually arranged into rows. It is set on the ground and pulled and cannot be backed up. It has no hydraulic functionality and has to be raised/adjusted with one or multiple manual levers. It was originally pulled by draft animals and later adapted to tractors. It is a largely outdated piece of farm equipment, having been replaced by more modern tillage equipment, however, smaller farmers still use them.

== Uses ==
A drag harrow is used to loosen and even out soil after it has been plowed and packed. The drag harrow also kills some weeds that may be present, but it is not very efficient in doing so, and it is not one of its primary functions.

== In modern times ==
The non-hydraulic drag harrow is not often used in modern farming as other harrows have proven to be more suitable, such as the disc harrow. Another reason they are not often used is because they cannot be controlled hydraulically, meaning that the operator is required to dismount from the tractor to adjust it or unclog it. However it is used as a drag behind several other implements such as a rod weeder. Due to their low cost and simplicity, old fashioned are still widely used by small farmers.

== See also ==
Drag harrows can be a name used for several different types of equipment. A spike tooth harrow or flex harrow is often called a drag harrow and is in use extensively throughout the US for seedbed preparation and for grooming grassland pastures. See also:

- Spike harrow
