= Drag harrow =

Outdated type of farming equipment

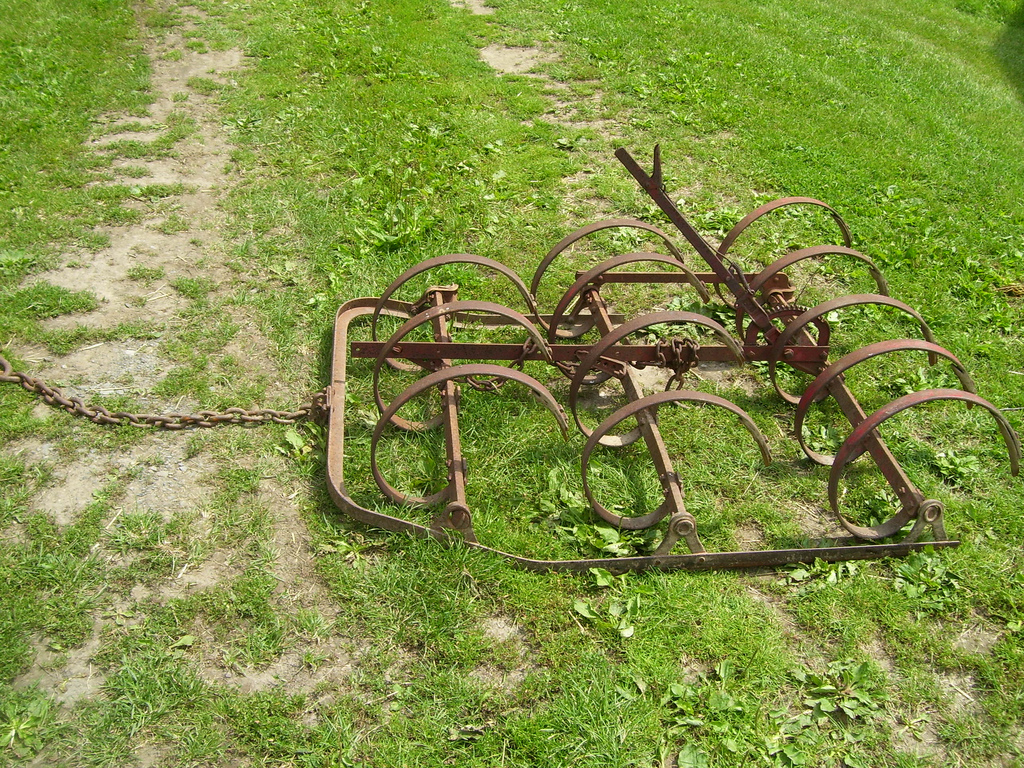
A 1.2 m (4 ft) drag harrow

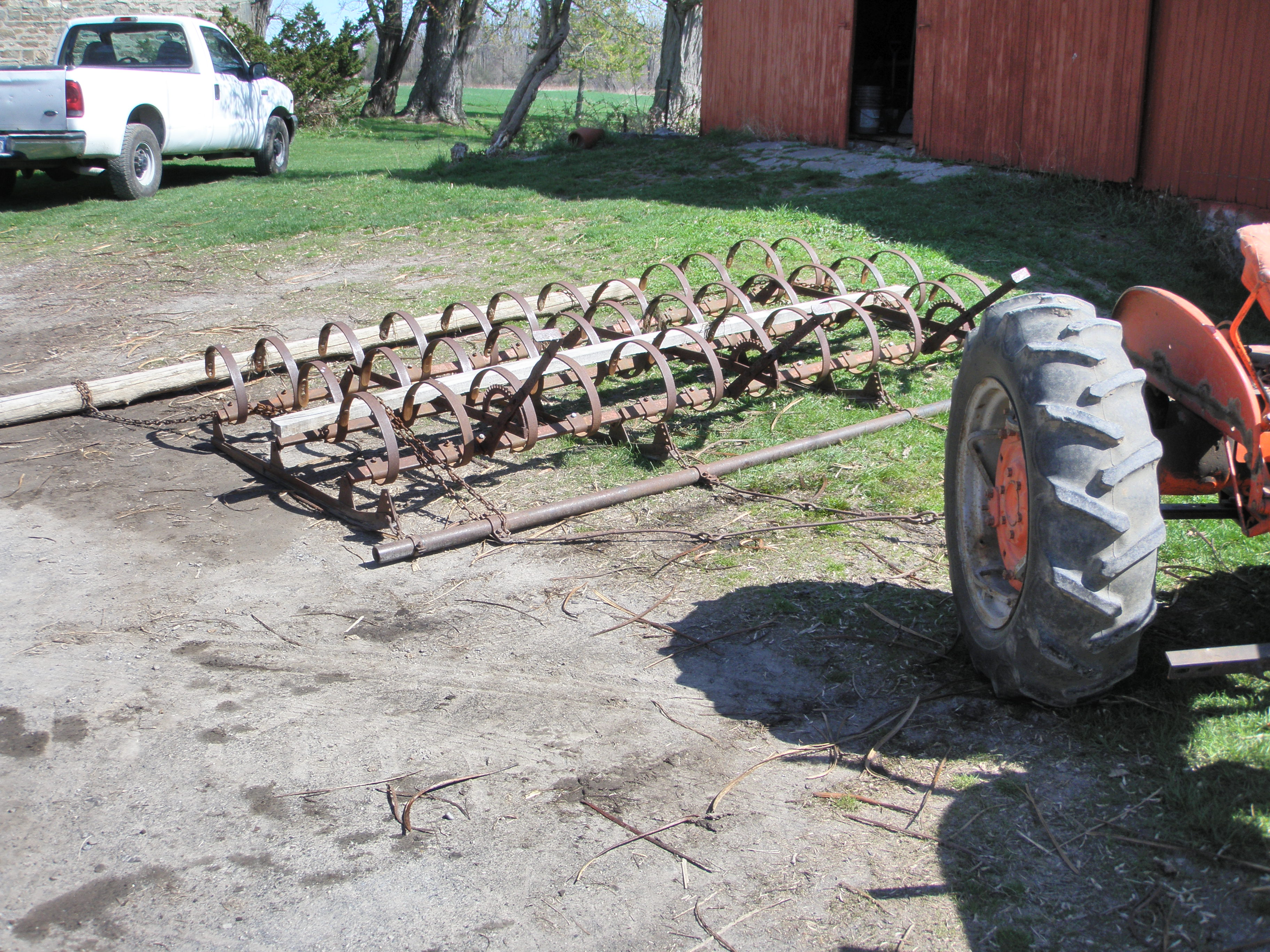
A larger, 3.7 m (12 ft) drag harrow simply uses three 1.2 m (4 ft) sections that are connected

A drag harrow, a type of spring-tooth harrow, is a largely outdated type of soil cultivation implement that is used to smooth the ground as well as loosen it after it has been plowed and packed. It uses many flexible iron teeth usually arranged into three rows. It has no hydraulic functionality and has to be raised and adjusted with one or multiple manual levers. It is a largely outdated piece of farm equipment, having been replaced by more modern disc harrows and hydraulically operated field cultivators.

== Uses ==
A drag harrow is used to loosen and even out soil after it has been plowed and packed. It pulls up large rocks which may then be picked up manually and put in the tractor's stone box to remove from the field. The drag harrow also kills some weeds that may be present, but it is not very efficient in doing so due to its highly flexible teeth, hence it is not one of its primary functions.

== In modern times ==
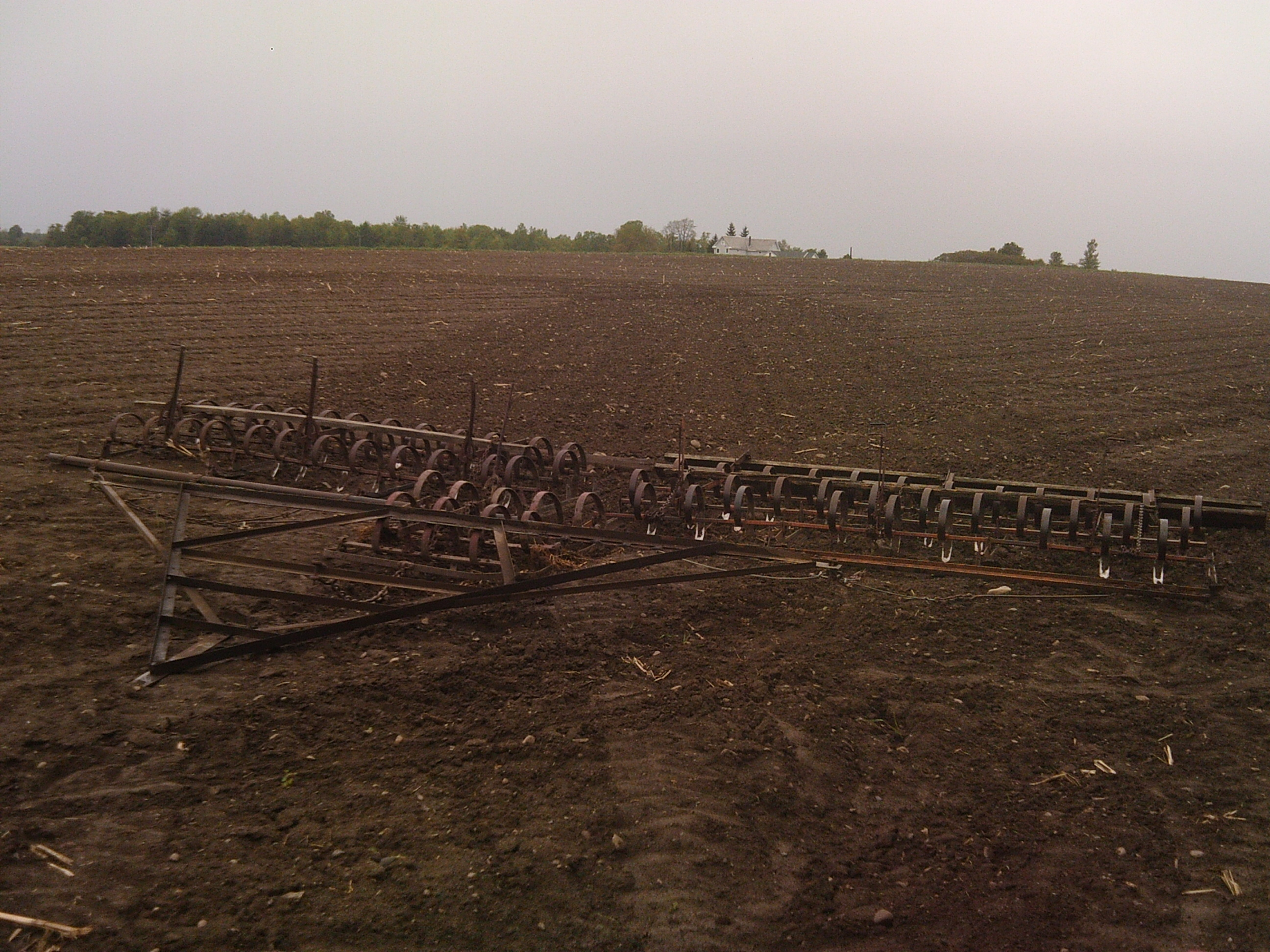
Three separate implements connected using a homemade hitch

The drag harrow is not often used in modern farming as other harrows have proven to be more suitable, such as the disc harrow. Another reason they are not often used is because they cannot be controlled hydraulically, meaning that the operator is required to dismount from the tractor to adjust it or unclog it. However it is used as a drag behind several other implements such as a rod weeder. Due to their low cost and simplicity, drag harrows are still used widely by small farmers.

== See also ==
- Spike harrow
