= James Ricketts =

James Ricketts may refer to:

- James B. Ricketts (1817–1887), United States Army officer
- James Ricketts (cricketer) (1842–1894), English cricketer
