= Roller (agricultural tool) =

Tool for flattening land or breaking up soil

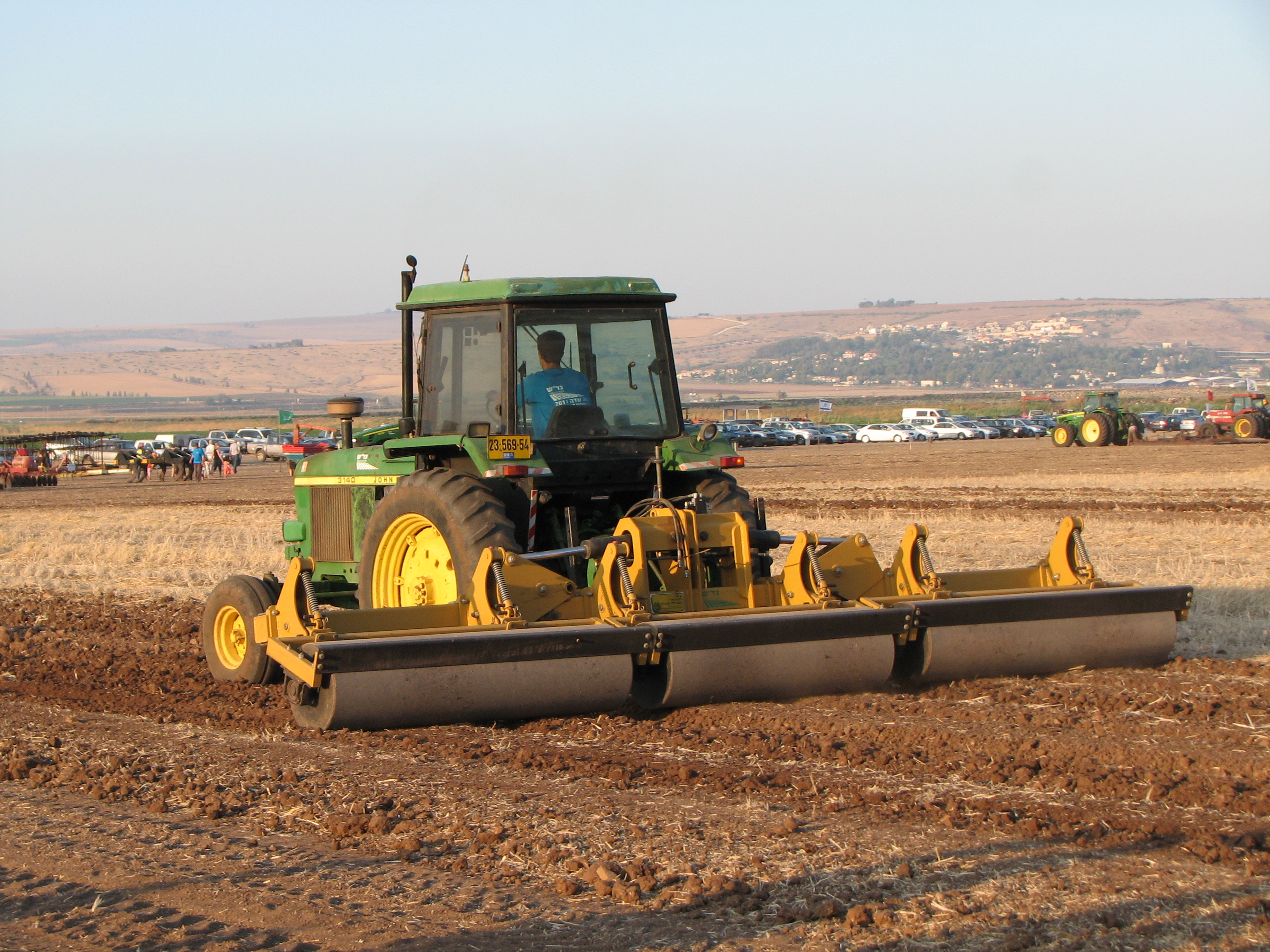
A roller in a typical power farming application

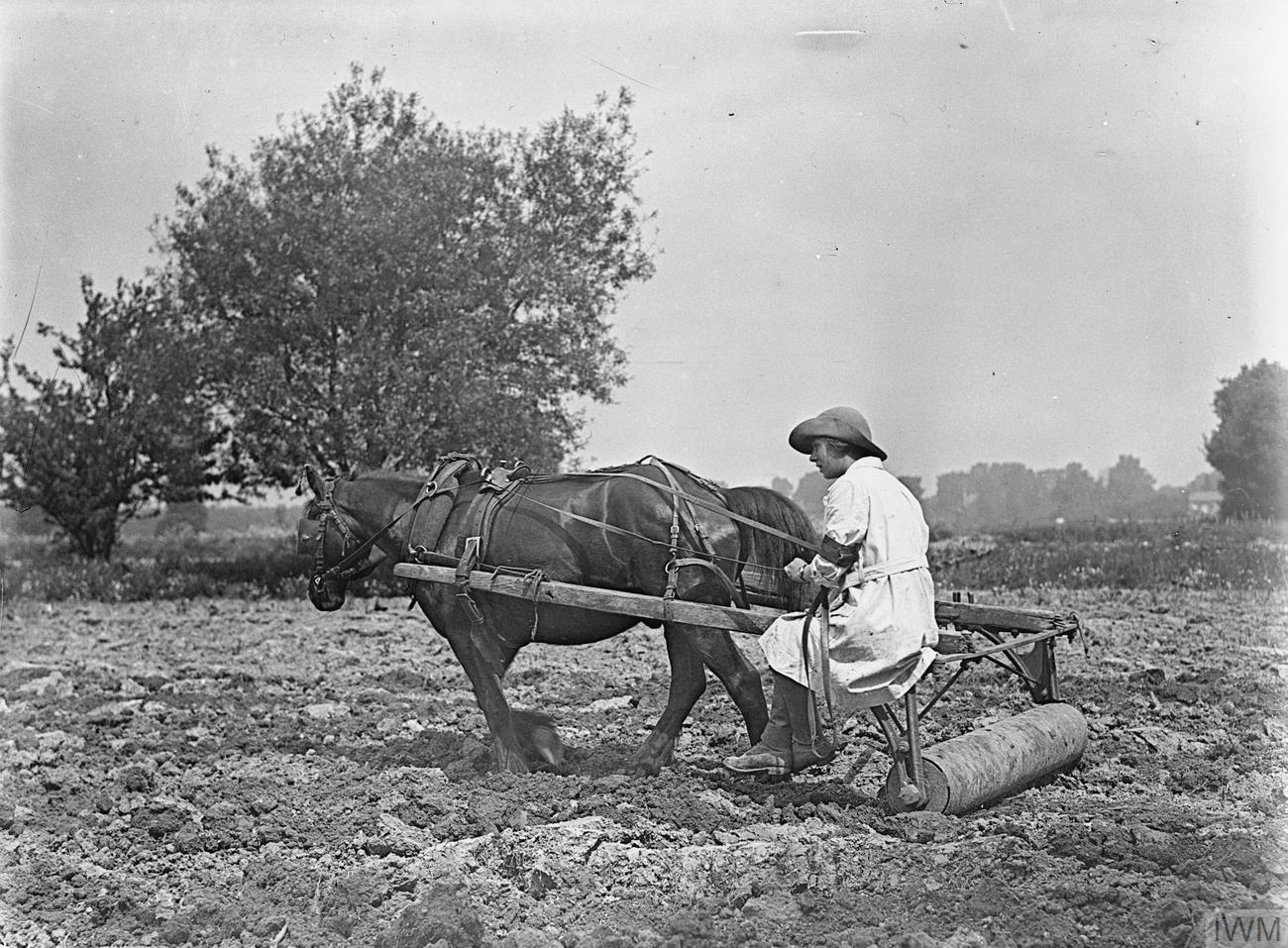
A horse-drawn agricultural roller during World War I

The roller is an agricultural tool used for flattening land or breaking up large clumps of soil, especially after ploughing or disc harrowing. Typically, rollers are pulled by tractors or, prior to mechanisation, a team of animals such as horses or oxen. As well as for agricultural purposes, rollers are used on cricket pitches and residential lawn areas.

Flatter land makes subsequent weed control and harvesting easier, and rolling can help to reduce moisture loss from cultivated soil. On lawns, rolling levels the land for mowing and compacts the soil surface.

Rollers may be weighted in different ways. For many uses a heavy roller is used. These may consist of one or more cylinders made of thick steel, a thinner steel cylinder filled with concrete, or a cylinder filled with water. A water-filled roller has the advantage that the water may be drained out for lighter use or for transport. In frost-prone areas a water filled roller must be drained for winter storage to avoid breakage due to the expansion for water as it turns to ice.

== Designs ==
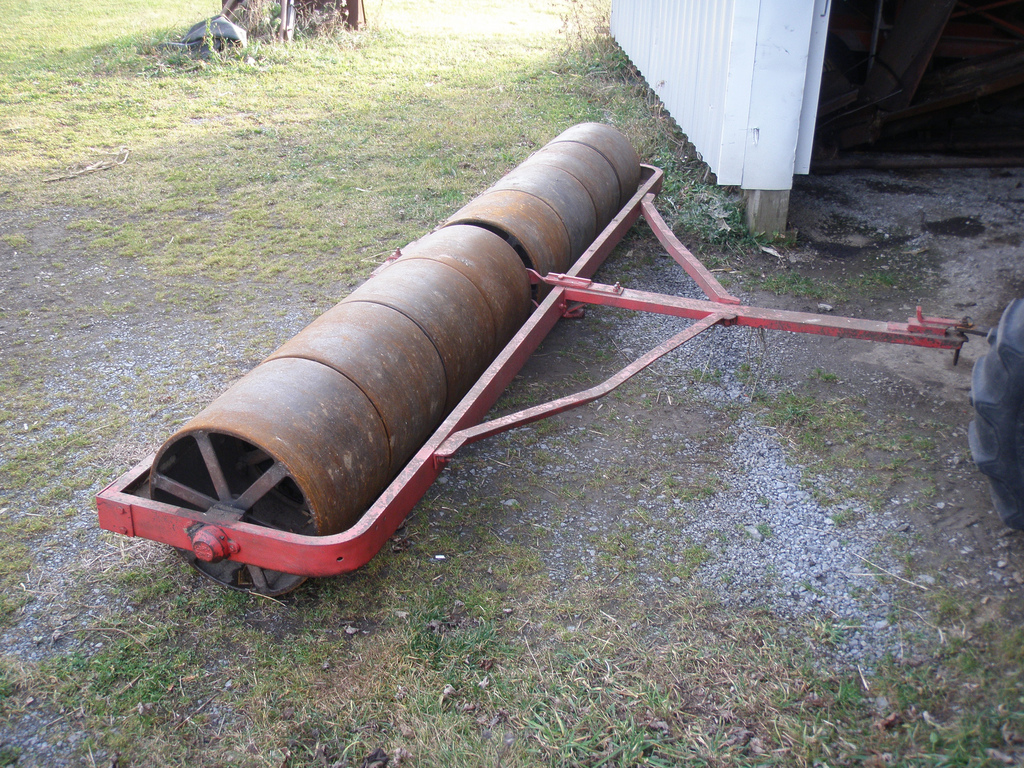
A 12-foot (3.7 m) smooth roller comprising eight 1.5-foot (46 cm) segments

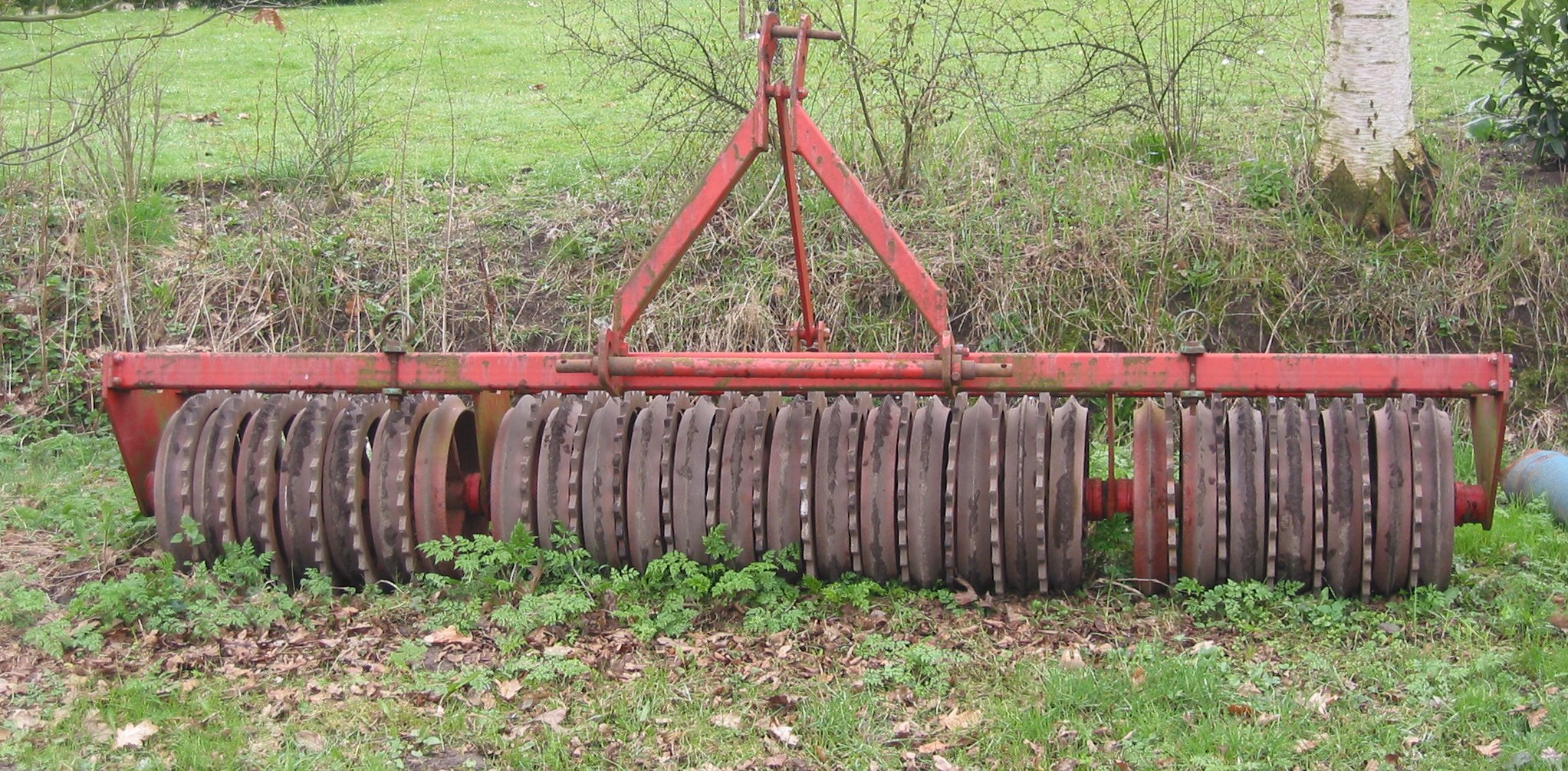
A ridged roller comprising many segments is usually called a Cambridge roller in the United Kingdom and a cultipacker in the United States; each name originated with a manufacturer in the respective country and evolved into the regionally prevalent name for the type.

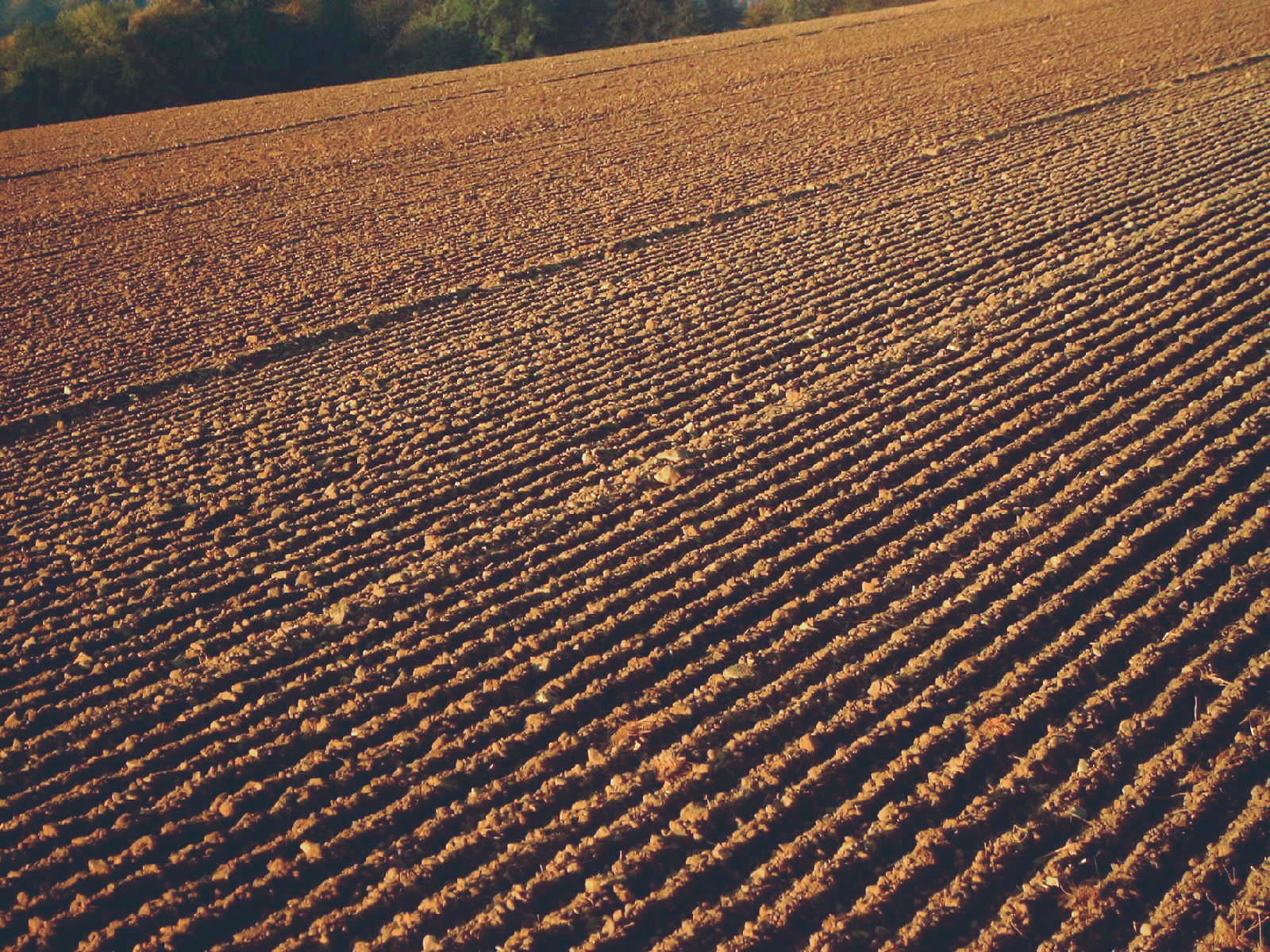
A field after rolling with a Cambridge (or similar) roller

=== One-piece versus segmented ===
On tilled soil a one-piece roller has the disadvantage that when turning corners the outer end of the roller has to rotate much faster than the inner end, forcing one or both ends to skid. A one-piece roller turned on soft ground will skid up a heap of soil at the outer radius, leaving heaps, which is counter-productive. Rollers are often made in two or three sections to reduce this problem, and the Cambridge roller overcomes it altogether by mounting many small segments onto one axle so that they can each rotate at local ground-speed.

=== Smooth versus ridged ===
The surface of rollers may be smooth, or it may be textured to help break up soil or to groove the final surface to reduce scouring from rain. Each segment of a Cambridge roller has a rib around its edge for this purpose. The name cultipacker is often used for such ridged types, especially in the United States.

== Uses ==
=== Farming use ===
Rollers are a secondary tillage tool used for flattening land or breaking up large clumps of soil, especially after ploughing or disc harrowing. Rollers are typically pulled by tractors today. Before mechanised agriculture, a team of working animals such as horses or oxen provided the power. Animal power is still used today in some contexts, such as on Amish farms in the United States and in regions of Asia where draft oxen are still widely used.

Rollers prepare optimal seedbeds by making them as flat as is practical and moderately firmed. Flatness is important at planting because it is the only practical way to control average seed planting depth without laborious hand planting of each seed; it is not practical to follow an instruction of (for example) 1-cm planting depth if the contour of the seedbed varies by 2 cm or more between adjacent spots. This is why breaking up of even small clods/lumps, and well-leveled spreading of soil, is important at planting time.

Flatter land also makes subsequent weed control and harvesting easier. For example, in mechanical weed control, controlling cultivator tooth depth is practical only with a decently flat soil contour, and in combining, controlling combine head height is practical only with a decently flat soil contour.

Rolling is also believed to help reduce moisture loss from cultivated soil.

==== Ganging and trailing ====
Rollers may be ganged to increase the width of each pass/swath. Rollers may be trailed after other equipment such as ploughs, disc harrows, or mowers.

=== Cricket pitch use ===
In cricket, rollers are used to make the pitch flat and less dangerous for batsmen.

Several size rollers have been used in the history of cricket, from light rollers that were used in the days of uncovered pitches and at some stages during the 1950s to make batting less easy, to the modern “heavy roller” universally used in top-class cricket today. Regulations permit a pitch only to be rolled at the commencement of each innings or day’s play, but this has still had a massive influence on the game by eliminating the shooters that were ubiquitous on all but light soils before heavy rollers were used. Heavy rollers have sometimes been criticised for making batting too easy and for reducing the rate at which pitches dry out after rain in the cool English climate.

=== Lawn use ===
Lawn rollers are designed to even out or firm up the lawn surface, especially in climates where heaving causes the lawn to be lumpy. Heaving may result when the ground freezes and thaws many times over winter. Where this occurs, gardeners are advised to give the lawn a light rolling with a lawn roller in the spring. Clay or wet soils should not be rolled as they become compacted.

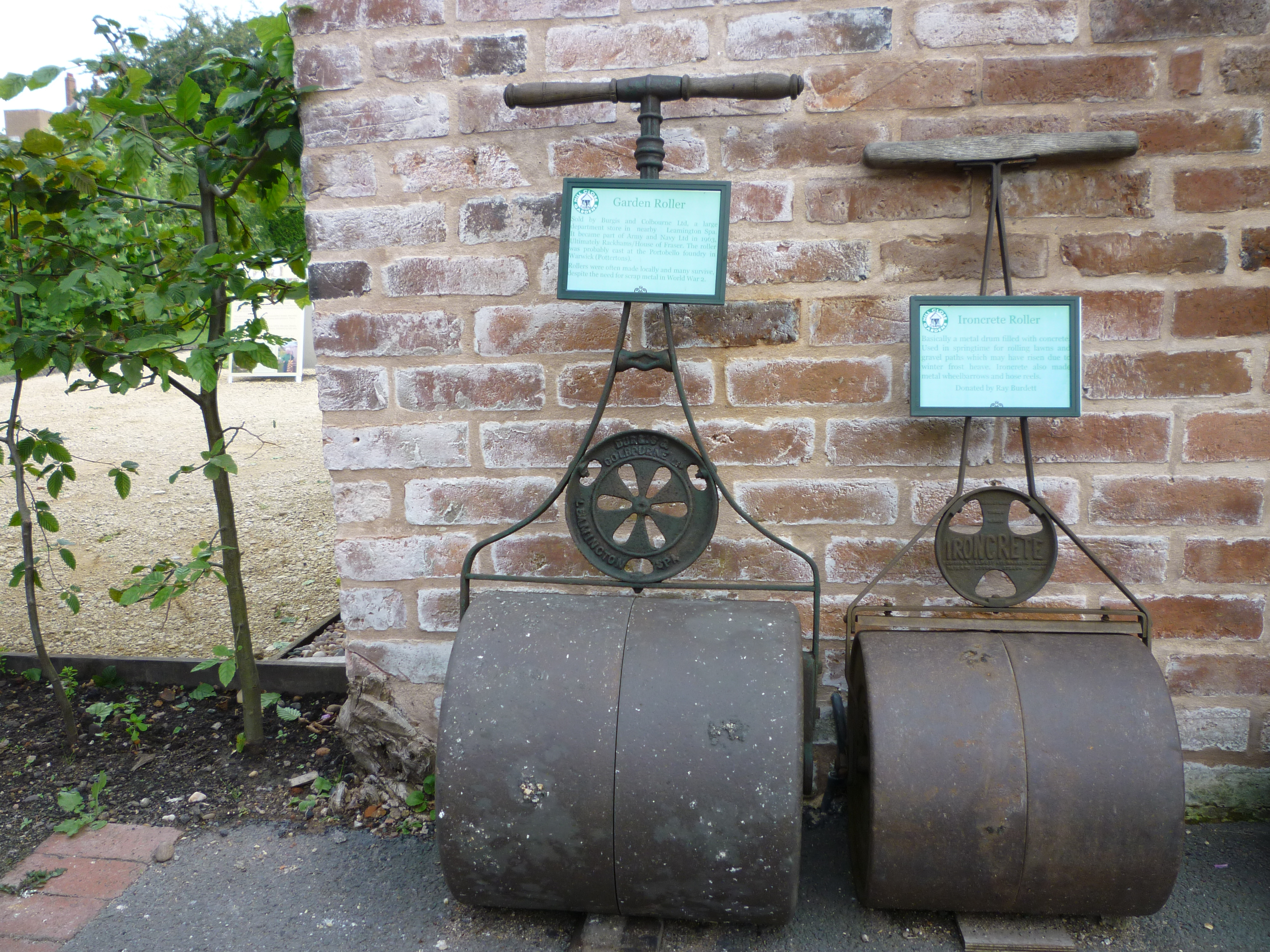
Two "garden rollers" in Hill Close Gardens, Warwick

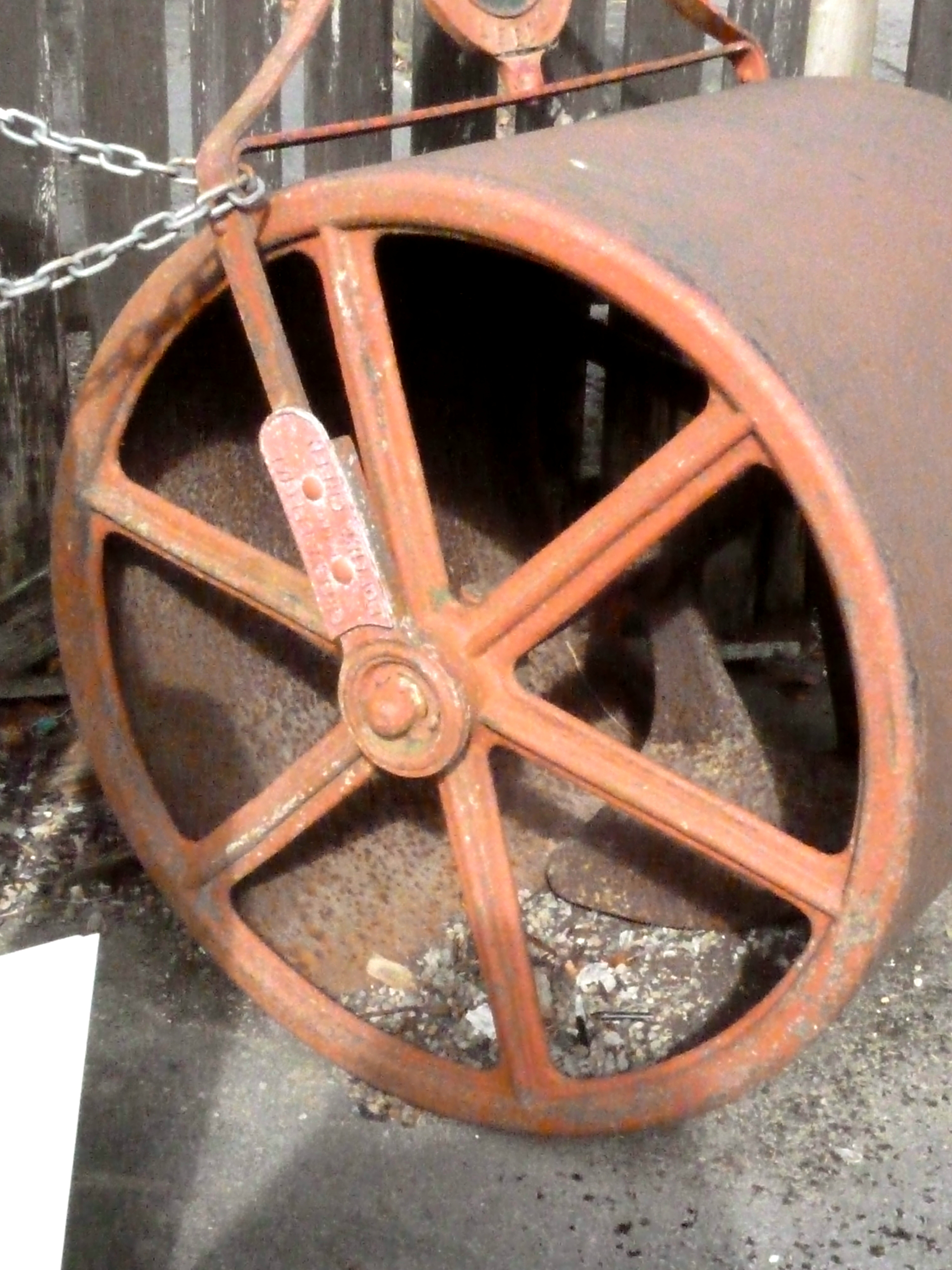
Large iron roller with suspended weight, for bowling greens, by Fred Verity (1890s)

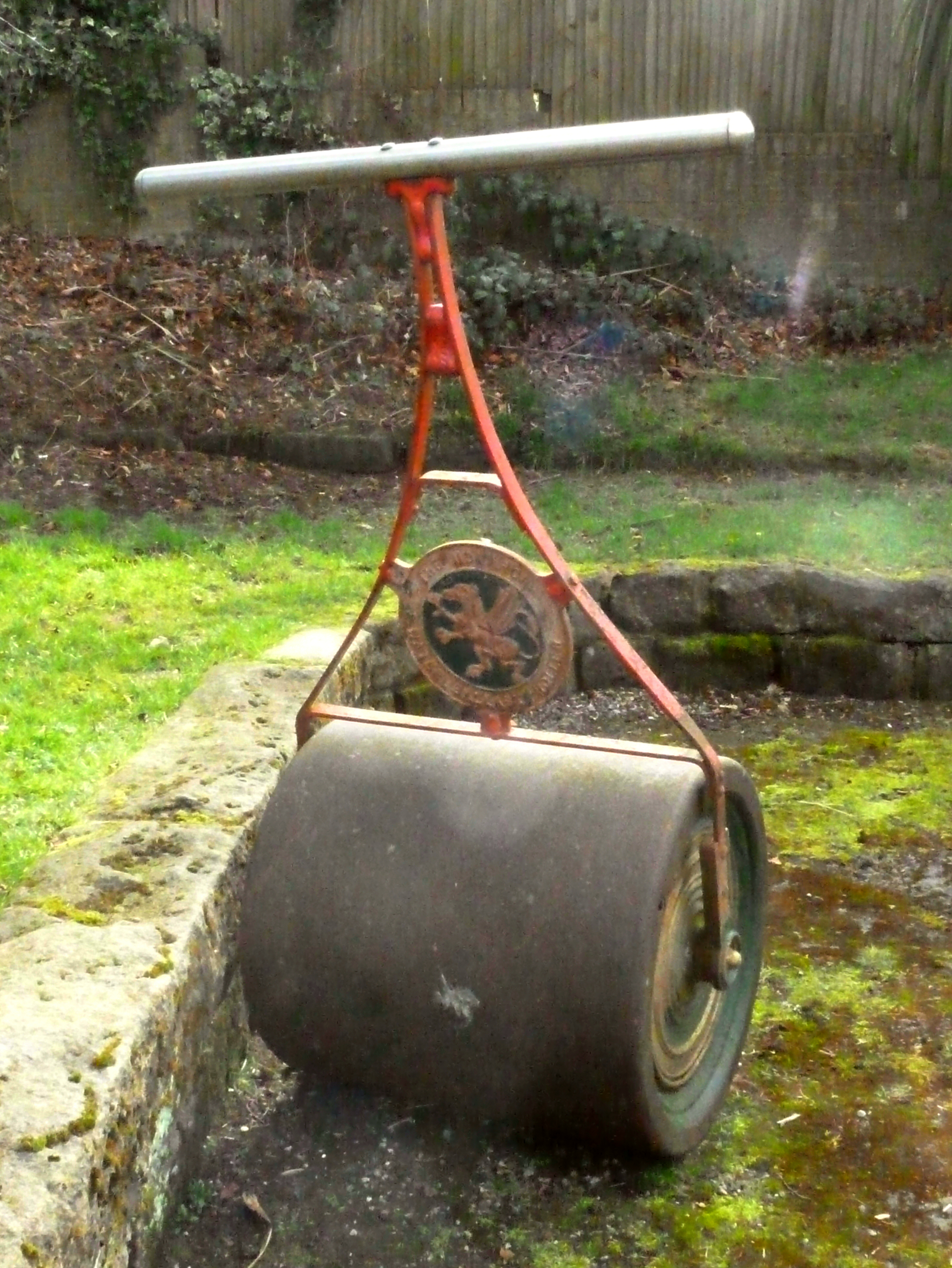
Water ballast roller by Fred Verity for Greens & Son (1890s)

== See also ==
- Harrow (tool)
