= Harrower =

- Pronunciation: /ˈhæroʊ.ər/

Origin
- Language: Anglo-Saxon
- Meaning: Subduer (of land); Derived from Middle English harwen meaning ‘to harrow’ or ‘to rake’
- Region of origin: Scotland

Other names
- Variant forms: Harower, Harewere

Harrower is an Anglo-Saxon surname. The first people to use the name were those who cultivated land (harrowed).

== List of notable people surnamed Harrower ==
- David Harrower (born 1966), Scottish playwright
- Elizabeth Harrower (actress) (1918–2003), American actress and screenwriter
- Elizabeth Harrower (writer) (1928–2020), Australian novelist and short story writer
- Gabriel T. Harrower (1816–1895), New York politician
- Henry Harrower (1883–1934), American endocrinologist
- Jimmy Harrower (footballer, born 1935) (1935–2006), Scottish footballer
- Jimmy Harrower (footballer, born 1924) (1924–1992), Scottish footballer
- John Douglas Harrower (born 1947), Anglican Bishop of Tasmania
- Kristi Harrower (born March 4, 1975), Australian basketball player
- Molly Harrower (1906–1999), South African clinical psychologist
- Pat Harrower (1860–?), Scottish rugby player
- William Harrower (1861–1910), Scottish international footballer

== See also ==
- Harrower Glacier
- Heru'ur, character in the television show Stargate SG-1
- The Harrowers, horror comic (also Clive Barker's The Harrowers)
