= Harrow (tool) =

Agricultural tool

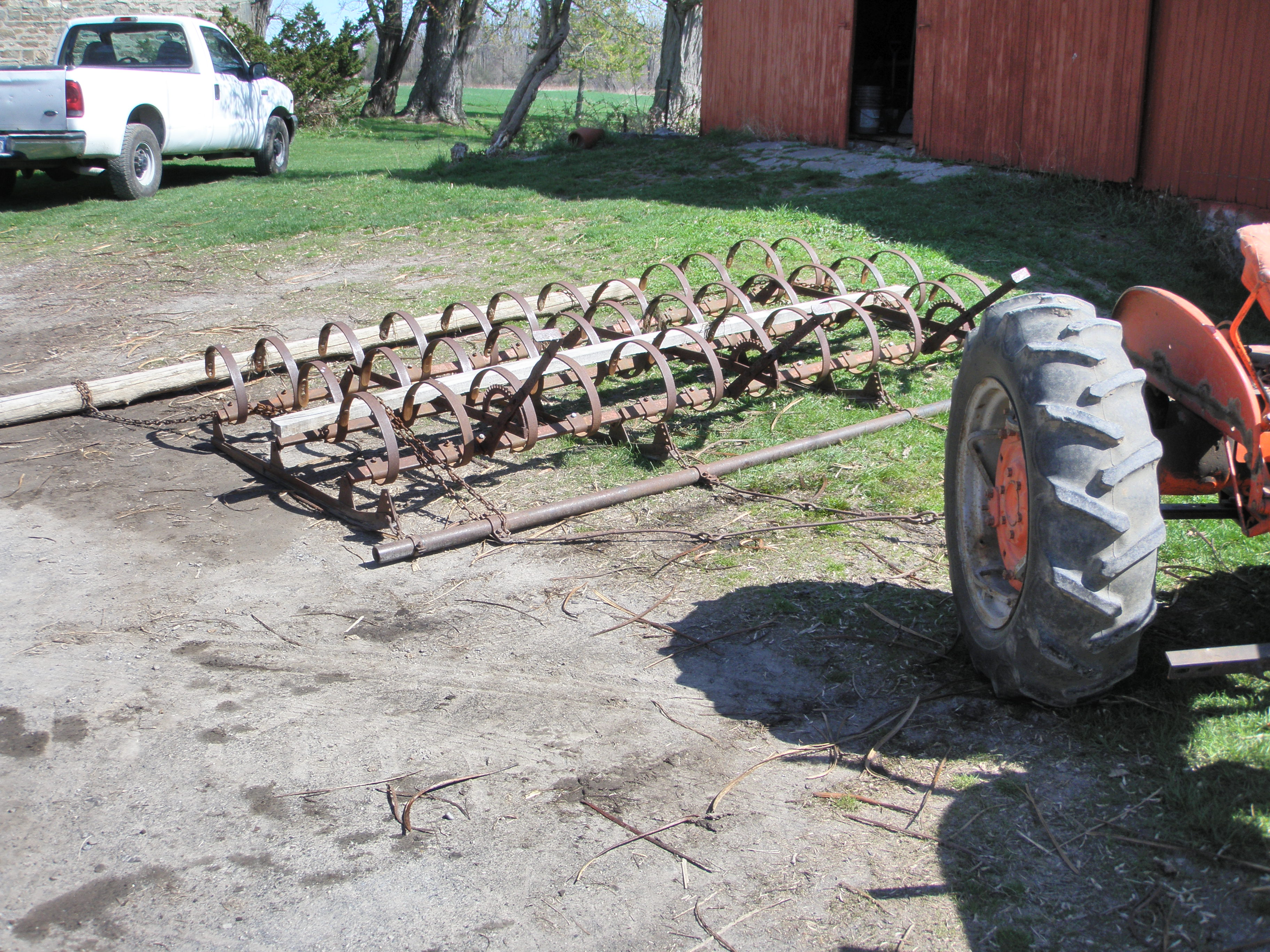
A spring-tooth drag harrow

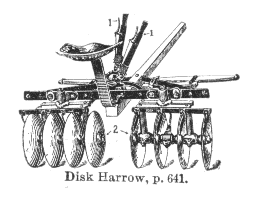
Disc harrows

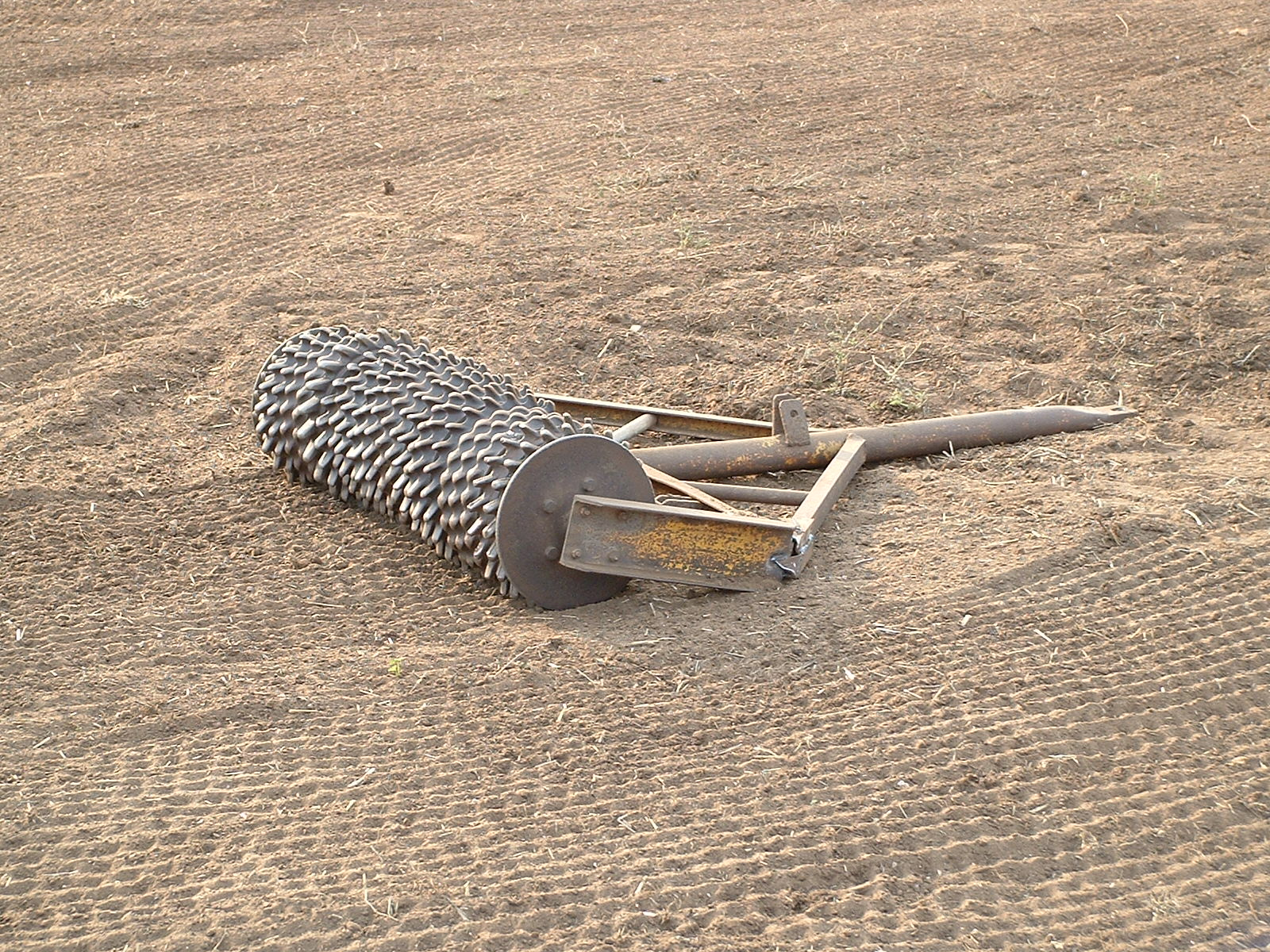
Crumbler roller, commonly used to compact soil after it has been loosened by a harrow

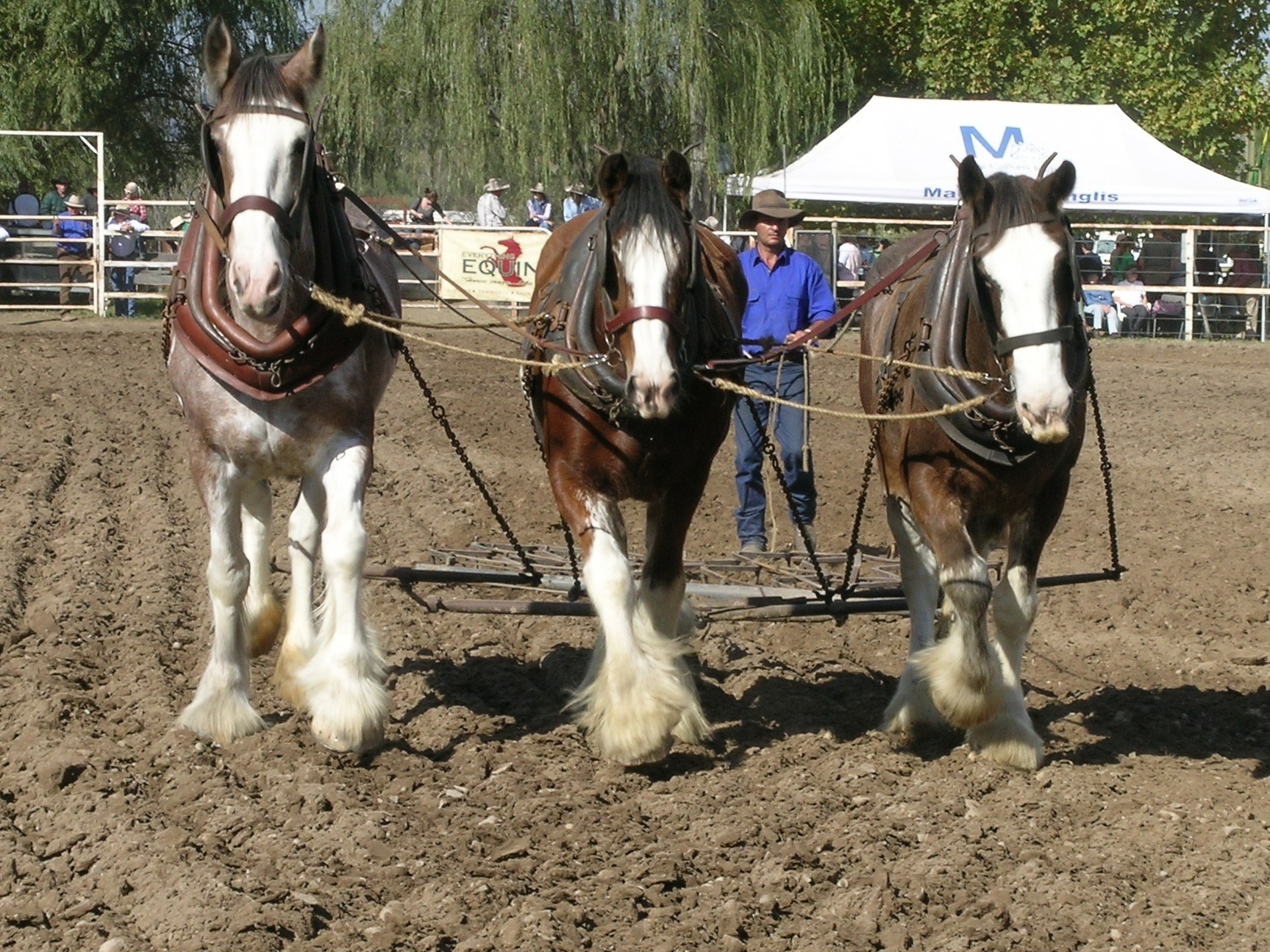
Clydesdale horses pulling spike harrows, Murrurundi, New South Wales, Australia

In agriculture, a harrow is a farm implement used for surface tillage. It is used after ploughing for breaking up and smoothing out the surface of the soil. The purpose of harrowing is to break up clods and to provide a soil structure, called tilth, that is suitable for planting seeds. Coarser harrowing may also be used to remove weeds and to cover seed after sowing.

Harrows differ from ploughs, which cut the upper 12 to 25 centimetre (5 to 10 in) layer of soil, and leave furrows, parallel trenches. Harrows differ from cultivators in that they disturb the whole surface of the soil, while a cultivator instead disturbs only narrow tracks between the crop rows to kill weeds.

There are four general types of harrows: disc harrows, tine harrows (including spring-tooth harrows, drag harrows, and spike harrows), chain harrows, and chain-disk harrows. Harrows were originally drawn by draft animals, such as horses, mules, or oxen, or in some times and places by manual labourers. In modern practice they are almost always tractor-mounted implements, either trailed after the tractor by a drawbar or mounted on the three-point hitch.

A modern development of the traditional tine harrow is the rotary power harrow, often just called a power harrow.

== Harrow action ==
In modern mechanized farming, generally a farmer will use two harrows, one after the other. The disk harrow is used first to slice up the large clods left by the mould-board plough, followed by the spring-tooth harrow. To save time and fuel they may be pulled by one tractor; the disk hitched to the tractor, and the spring-tooth hitched to, and directly behind, the disk. The result is a smooth field with powdery dirt at the surface.

Action of a harrow on a ploughed field
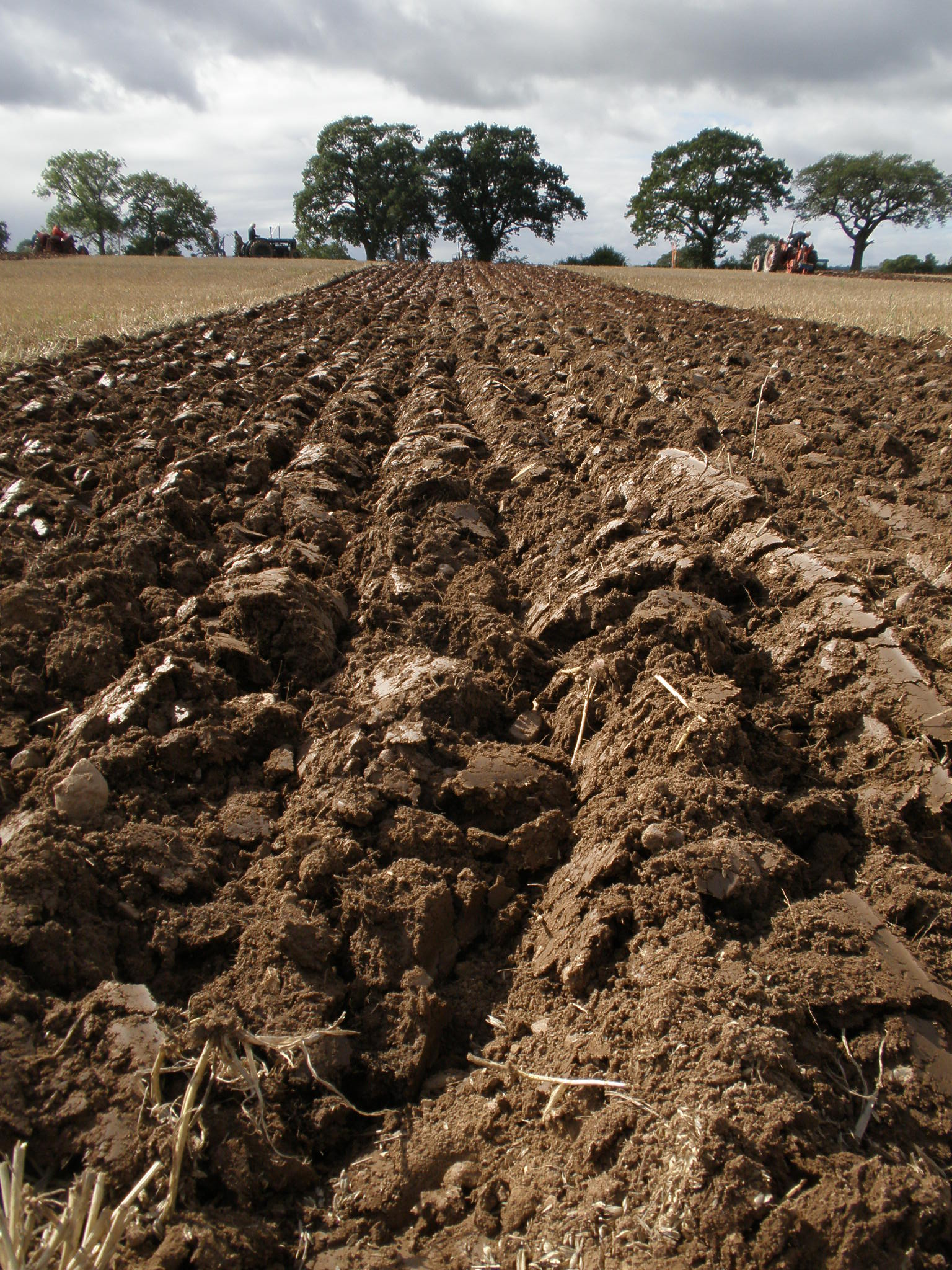
The plough makes distinct furrows across the field.

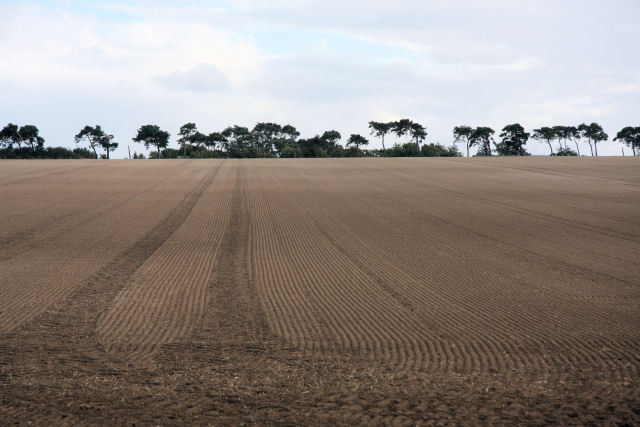
The harrow smooths the surface of the ploughed field.

== Types ==
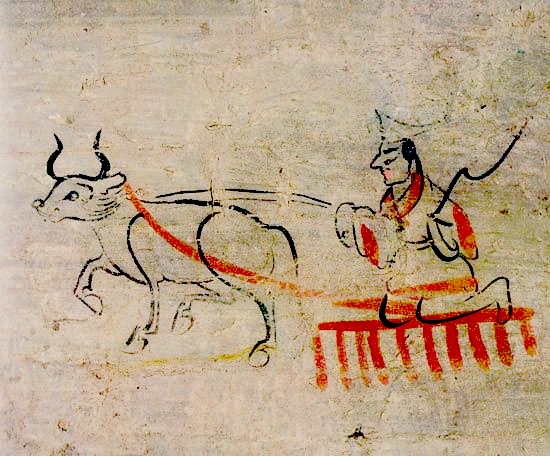
An ox-drawn harrow in a painting from Yanju's tomb, located in Jiuquan, 5th century AD

In cooler climates, the most common types are the disc harrow, the chain harrow, the tine harrow or spike harrow and the spring tine harrow. Chain harrows are often used for lighter work, such as leveling the tilth or covering the seed, while disc harrows are typically used for heavy work, such as following ploughing to break up the sod. In addition, there are various types of power harrow, in which the cultivators are power-driven from the tractor rather than depending on its forward motion.

Tine harrows are used to refine seed-bed conditions before planting, remove small weeds in growing crops, and loosen the inter-row soils to allow water to soak into the subsoil. The fourth is a chain disk harrow. Disks attached to chains are pulled at an angle over the ground. These harrows move rapidly across the surface. The chain and disk rotate to stay clean while breaking up the top surface to about 1 inch (3 cm) deep. A smooth seedbed is prepared for planting with one pass.

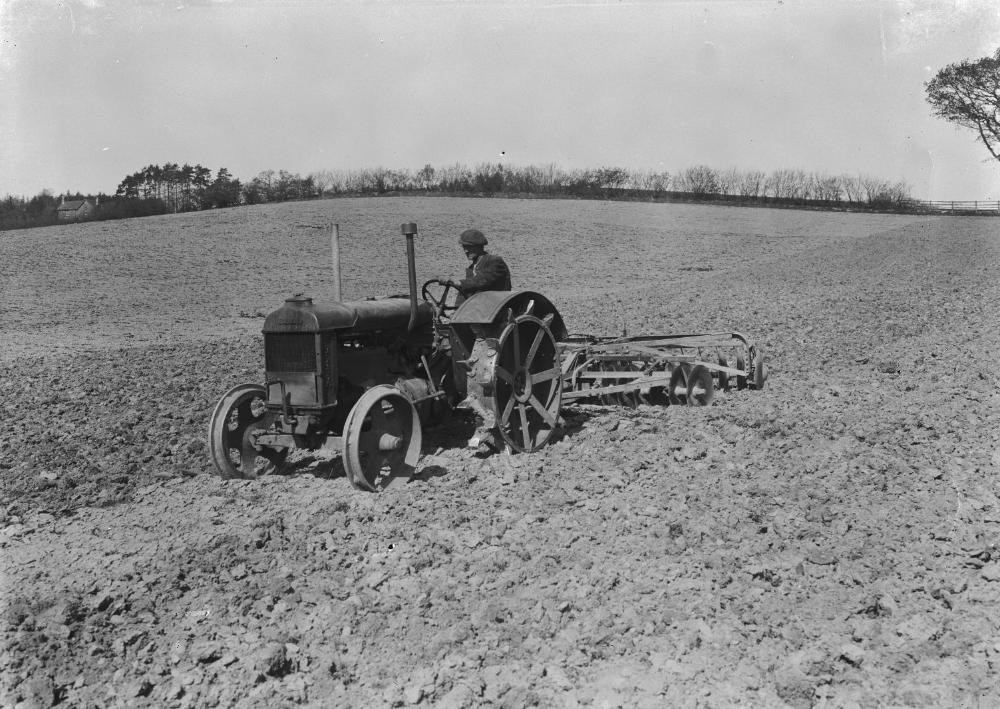
Harrowing with tractor and disk harrow in the 1940s

Chain harrowing can be used on pasture land to spread dung and break up dead material (thatch) in the sward. Similarly, in sports-ground maintenance, light chain harrowing is often used to level off the ground after heavy use to remove and smooth out boot marks and indentations. Used on tilled land in combination with the other two types, chain harrowing rolls remaining larger soil clumps to the surface, where weather breaks them down and prevents interference with seed germination.

All four harrow types can be used in one pass to prepare soil for seeding. Using any combination of two harrows for various tilling processes is also common. Where harrowing provides a very fine tilth or the soil is very light so that it might easily be wind-blown, a roller is often added as the last of the set.

Harrows may be of several types and weights, depending on their purpose. They almost always consist of a rigid frame that holds discs, teeth, linked chains, or other means of moving soil—but tine and chain harrows are often only supported by a rigid towing bar at the front of the set.

In the southern hemisphere, so-called giant discs are a specialised kind of disc harrows that can stand in for a plough in rough country where a mouldboard plough cannot handle tree stumps and rocks, and a disc-plough is too slow (because of its limited number of discs). Giant scalloped-edged discs operate in a set, or frame, that is often weighted with concrete or steel blocks to improve penetration of the cutting edges. This cultivation is usually followed by broadcast fertilisation and seeding rather than drilled or row seeding.

A drag is a heavy harrow.

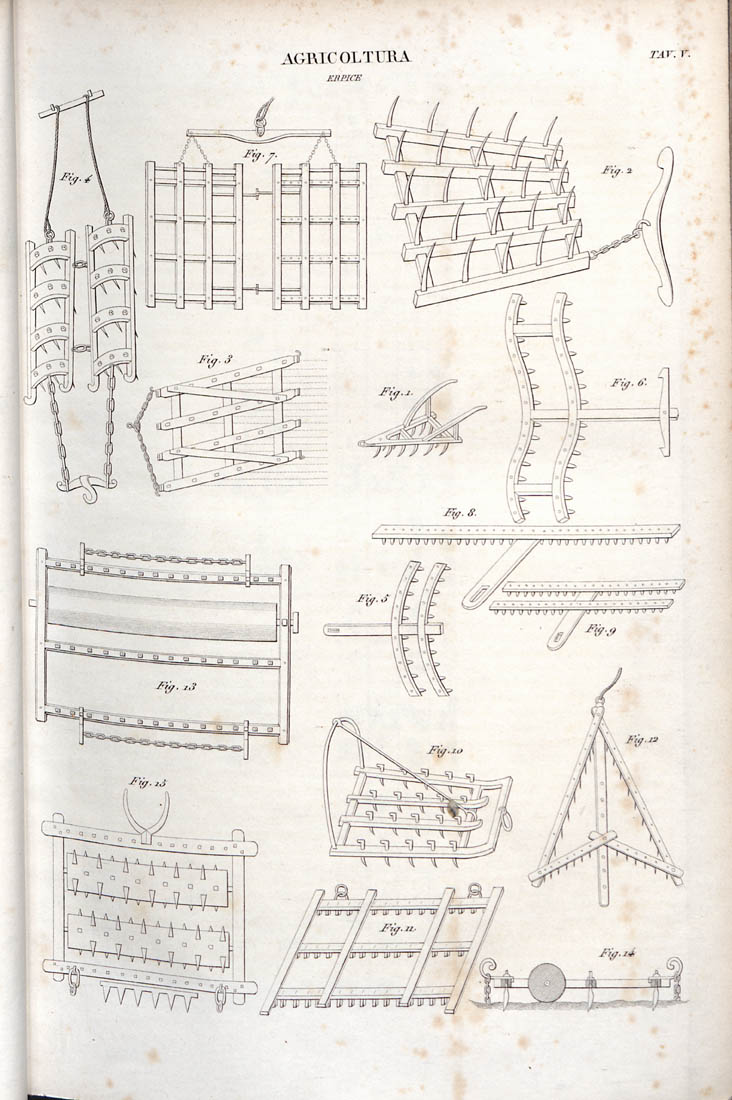
19th century spike harrows

=== Power harrow ===
A rotary power harrow, or simply a power harrow, has vertical tines that are mounted in sets. Each set of tines is rotated on a vertical axis so that soil near the tines is moved in a horizontal direction. The result is that, unlike with a rotary tiller, soil layers are not turned over or inverted, which is useful in preventing dormant weed seeds from being brought to the surface, and there is no horizontal slicing of the subsurface soil that can lead to hardpan formation.

== Historical reference ==
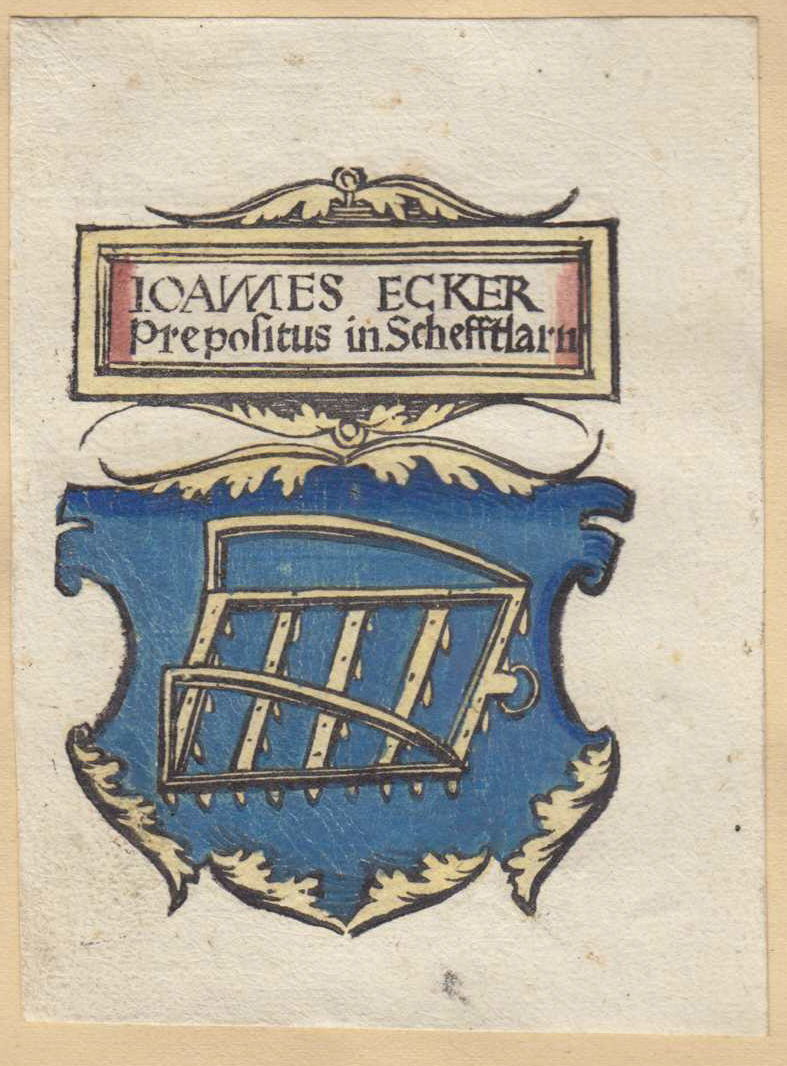
Spike harrow depicted on a 16th-century German coat-of-arms

In Europe, harrows were used in antiquity and the Middle Ages.

In China, the rake had appeared by the Han dynasty (202 BC – 220 AD). The rake developed into other implements such as the harrow by the end of the Han dynasty. Two kinds of tined harrows were known during the Han dynasty, the flat harrow known as the pa, which was used throughout China in both wet and dry fields, and the vertical harrow known as the chao, which was only used in wet rice fields in the south. The pa is depicted three times in the murals of Jiayuguan dating to the Wei-Jin period (220–316) while the earliest known representation of the chao is a pottery model from a grave in Guangdong dated between 310 and 312. The harrow was mentioned in the Chinese agricultural text Qimin Yaoshu (Essential Techniques for the Welfare of the People) written by the Northern Wei (386–535) official Jia Sixie. The harrow was used as a farm implement for breaking up soil chunks as well as eradicating weeds, suppressing pests, and diseases. The text describes the harrow as an iron-teeth rake that could take the form of a strip, Y-shape, or square. Most of the Wei and Jin harrows were strip shaped. Another type of harrow replaced the iron teeth with canes and brambles.

== See also ==
- List of agricultural machinery
- Roller (agricultural tool)
- Harrower (surname)

== Bibliography ==
- Bray, Francesca (1984), Science and Civilization in China Volume 6: Biology and Biological Technology Part II: Agriculture, Cambridge University Press
