= Charles Young (cricketer) =

English cricketer (1852–1913)

Personal information
- Full name: Charles Robertson Young
- Born: 2 February 1852; Dharwar, Kingdom of Mysore, British India
- Died: 12 April 1913 (aged 61); Bolton, Lancashire, England
- Height: 6 ft 0 in (1.83 m)
- Batting: Left-handed
- Bowling: Left-arm medium

Domestic team information
- Years: Team
- 1867–1885: Hampshire

Umpiring information
- FC umpired: 3 (1887–1888)

Career statistics
Competition	First-class
Matches	38
Runs scored	717
Batting average	11.95
100s/50s	–/–
Top score	48
Balls bowled	7,381
Wickets	149
Bowling average	21.86
5 wickets in innings	8
10 wickets in match	3
Best bowling	7/19
Catches/stumpings	35/–
- Source: Cricinfo, 10 December 2009

Charles Robertson Young (2 February 1852 — 12 April 1913) was an English first-class cricketer.

The son of D. Young, an assistant superintendent in the Revenue Survey of the Indian Civil Service, Young was born in British India at Dharwar in February 1852. Young made his debut in first-class cricket for Hampshire against Kent at Gravesend in 1867. At the time, he was aged 15 years and 131 days, making him the youngest debutant in first-class cricket. His record was eventually surpassed by the Indian cricketer Mohammad Ramzan who was aged 12 years and 247 days on his first-class debut in October 1937. His record did however remain an English first-class record until 2011, when Yorkshire's Barney Gibson debuted aged 15 years and 27 days. During his debut, Young scored 20 not out batting at number 9 and took his maiden wicket, that of Kent opening batsman George Bennett. He made a further two appearances in 1867, both against Kent.

As a professional cricketer, he was engaged by various clubs over the proceeding decade. These included spells playing for Dumfries Cricket Club in Scotland in 1875–76, and Stubbington Cricket Club near Fareham in 1877. It was in 1877 that he returned to playing first-class cricket for Hampshire, when he was selected against Derbyshire. He played for Hampshire until 1885, making a total of 38 first-class appearances. Playing primarily as a left-arm medium pace bowler, he took 149 wickets at an average of 21.86; he took eight five wicket hauls and took ten wickets in a match on three occasions. His best innings figures were 7 for 19, taken against the Marylebone Cricket Club in 1882. He was described by Haygarth in Scores and Biographies as "an average left-handed bat", scoring 717 runs at a batting average of 11.95; his highest first-class score was 48. As a fielder, he took 35 catches. Despite Hampshire losing their first-class status at the end of the 1885 season, Young continued to play second-class county cricket until 1890. He was also known to play minor matches for both the Gentlemen and the Players of Hampshire.

In the late 1880s, he stood as an umpire in three first-class matches. Whilst resident at Southampton, he was otherwise employed as a clerk. He had married Elizabeth Payne in 1873 at South Stoneham. Young later relocated to Bolton, where he worked as an insurance agent. He died at there in April 1913 from bronchial asthma and cardiac failure; his wife had predeceased him two years prior.

Preceded by Fred Grace (15 years and 159 days)	Youngest first-class cricketer (15 years and 131 days); 13 June 1867 – 22 October 1937	Succeeded by Mohammad Ramzan (12 years and 247 days)
