= 1826 English cricket season =

Cricket season review

The 1826 English cricket season was the 40th since the foundation of Marylebone Cricket Club (MCC). The revival of inter-county cricket gathered pace and William Clarke made his known debut in historically important eleven-a-side matches. (Note: Any match listed in the ACS' Important Match Guide (1981) is historically important, and therefore of the highest standard, whether or not a scorecard might exist. The same applies to numerous matches discovered by researchers since 1981. For further information, see First-class cricket.)

== Honours ==
- Most runs – Tom Marsden 227 @ 227.00 (HS 227: he had just the one innings)
- Most wickets – William Lillywhite 27 (BB 9–?)

== Important matches ==
- A total of seven important matches were recorded in 1826, including four inter-county matches.

== Events ==
- The Lord's pavilion, gutted by fire in July 1825, was rebuilt in time for MCC's annual dinner on Thursday 11 May.
- Inter-county cricket flourished again, mainly through the efforts of the Sussex county organisation based on the Midhurst club. Sussex played matches against Kent and a combined Hampshire/Surrey team.
- 24 to 26 July — Yorkshire's first great player Tom Marsden scored 227 for Sheffield and Leicester v Nottingham at the Darnall New Ground in Sheffield. A report said that Marsden batted over eight hours, approximately 4½ hours on the 25th and 3½ hours on the 26th.
- 5 May — a significant event that would in time accelerate the spread of cricket throughout England was the passage of an Act of Parliament that authorised creation of the Liverpool to Manchester Railway and effectively began the "railway boom".
- 31 December — death of John Small, the great Hambledon batsman.

== First mentions ==
Top-class players who made their known debuts in 1826:

- William Clarke – Nottingham and Nottinghamshire. An outstanding slow bowler who founded the All England Eleven in 1846.
- Thomas Box – Sussex. One of the greatest wicket-keepers of the 19th century. Played for over 30 seasons and then became proprietor of the Royal New Ground (known as "Box's Ground) and the Royal Brunswick Ground.
- Tom Marsden – Sheffield and Yorkshire. Left-handed batter who was noted for his hard-hitting style, and a roundarm slow left arm spinner. Also an important single wicket player.
- Thomas Barker – Nottingham and Nottinghamshire. Roundarm fast bowler.
- James Cobbett – Middlesex and MCC. All-rounder who bowled with a slow roundarm action.

== Bibliography ==
- ACS (1981). A Guide to Important Cricket Matches Played in the British Isles 1709–1863. Nottingham: ACS. OCLC 85045528.
- Haygarth, Arthur (1997) [1862]. Scores & Biographies, Volume 2 (1827–1840). Kennington: Frederick Lillywhite. ISBN 978-19-00592-23-9.
