= 1857 English cricket season =

Cricket season review

The 1857 English cricket season was the 31st of the roundarm era. (Note: Any match listed in the ACS' Important Match Guide (1981) is historically important, and therefore of the highest standard, whether or not a scorecard might exist. The same applies to numerous matches discovered by researchers since 1981. For further information, see First-class cricket.) A highlight was the first AEE v UEE contest.

== Important matches ==
1857 match list

== Events ==
The AEE and UEE began an annual series of matches against each other that continued until 1869. The fixture was the most important of the season while it lasted. Two games were played in 1857, both at Lord's and both won by the AEE.

AEE players in 1857 included: G Parr (captain), AJD Diver, HH Stephenson, J Caesar, RC Tinley, G Anderson, E Willsher and J Jackson.

UEE players in 1857 included: J Wisden (captain), J Dean, J Grundy, W Caffyn, John Lillywhite, T Lockyer, W Mortlock and W Martingell.

J. Grundy became the first player to be given out handling the ball when playing for MCC vs. Kent at Lord's.

== Leading batsmen ==
William Caffyn was the leading runscorer with 612 @ 18.00

Other leading batsmen were: J Lillywhite, G Parr, T Lockyer, J Grundy, J Caesar, HH Stephenson, J Wisden, J Dean

== Leading bowlers ==
William Caffyn was the leading wicket-taker with 126

Other leading bowlers were: J Wisden, J Jackson, E Willsher, G Griffith, W Martingell, J Lillywhite, CDB Marsham, FW Bell

== Bibliography ==
- ACS (1981). A Guide to Important Cricket Matches Played in the British Isles 1709–1863. Nottingham: ACS. OCLC 85045528.
- Warner, Pelham (1946). Lords: 1787–1945. London: Harrap. OCLC 877106024.
