= Barney Gibson =

English cricketer (born 1996)

Personal information
- Full name: Barney Peter Gibson
- Born: 31 March 1996 (age 30); Leeds, West Yorkshire, England
- Batting: Right-handed
- Role: Wicket-keeper

Domestic team information
- Years: Team
- 2011: Yorkshire
- Only First-class: 27 April 2011 Yorkshire v Durham MCCU

Career statistics
Competition	First-class
Matches	1
Runs scored	1
Batting average	–
100s/50s	0/0
Top score	1*
Catches/stumpings	6/0
- Source: CricketArchive, 3 April 2015

Barney Peter Gibson (born 31 March 1996) is a former English cricketer who played as a wicket-keeper for Yorkshire. He is the youngest cricketer to play first-class cricket in England making his debut for Yorkshire in April 2011 aged 15 years and 27 days.

== Early life ==
Gibson was born in Leeds, England and attended Crawshaw School in Pudsey. Before making his first-class debut, he represented Yorkshire County Cricket Club at Under-11, Under-12 and Under-13 levels. He had also played at schoolboy level for Leeds United, whose books he had been on between the ages of eight and twelve, before giving up football to concentrate on cricket.

== Playing career ==
=== Club cricket ===
Gibson plays his club cricket for Bradford Cricket League side Pudsey Congs, becoming the first team wicket-keeper at the age of 14.

=== First-class career ===
Gibson made his debut for Yorkshire in a three-day match against the Durham MCC University (Durham MCCU) on 27 April 2011 at the age of 15 years, 27 days beating the previous record held for 144 years by Charles Young who had represented Hampshire at the age of 15 years, 131 days in 1867. He was selected ahead of Jonny Bairstow and Gerard Brophy, the two first-choice wicket-keepers, who were rested by Yorkshire. To make his debut, his school gave him permission to miss lessons. Gibson was glad to avoid school that day, stating:

I was supposed to have triple science, double Maths and RE. They have sent me up here with some homework to do though.

He made two catches in the first innings and four in the second innings of his debut match, two each off the bowling of Oliver Hannon-Dalby, David Wainwright and Ajmal Shahzad.

On 3 April 2015, it was announced that Gibson had left Yorkshire and retired from cricket to pursue other career options.
