= James Ricketts (cricketer) =

English cricketer

James Ricketts (9 February 1842 – 3 June 1894) was an English cricketer active from 1867 to 1877 who played for Lancashire. He was born in Manchester and died in Sale, Cheshire. He appeared in 42 first-class matches as a righthanded batsman and occasional wicketkeeper who also bowled right arm slow pace with a roundarm action. He scored 1,226 runs with a highest score of 195* (his sole century) and held 28 catches with one stumping. He took twelve wickets with a best analysis of four for 40.
