= Seedbed =

Local soil where seeds are planted

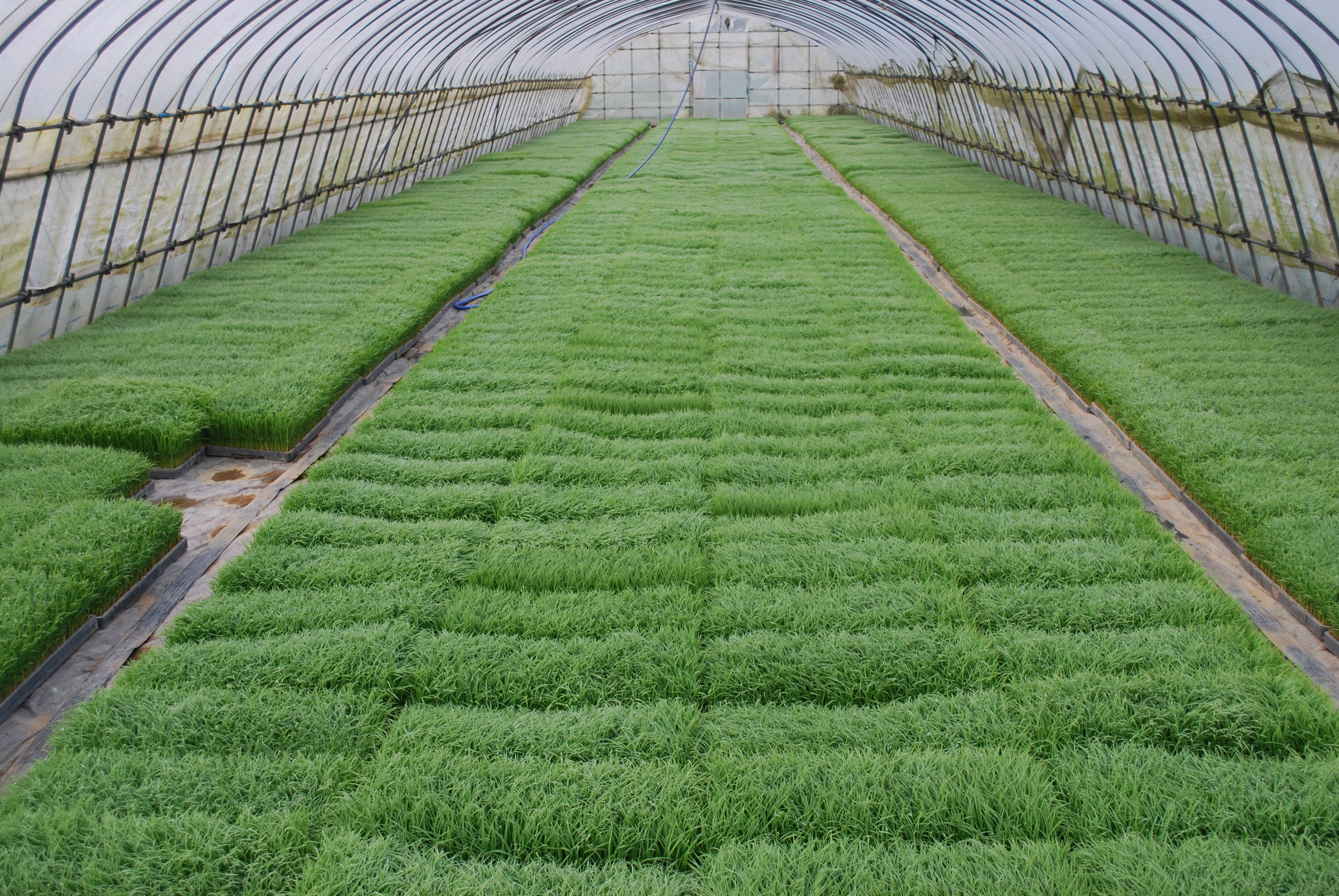
A seedbed of rice plants

A seedbed or seedling bed is the local soil environment in which seeds are planted. Often, it comprises not only the soil but also a specially prepared cold frame, hotbed or raised bed used to grow the seedlings in a controlled environment into larger young plants before transplanting them into a garden or field. A seedling bed increases the number of seeds that germinate.

== Soil type ==
The soil of a seedbed needs to be loose and smoothed, without large lumps. These traits are needed so that seeds can be planted easily, and at a specific depth for best germination. Many types of seedlings also need loose soil with minimal rocky content for best conditions to grow their roots. (For example, carrots grown in rocky soil will tend not to grow straight.)

== Preparation ==
Seedbed preparation in farm fields often involves secondary tillage via harrows and cultivators. This may follow primary tillage (if any) by moldboard plows or chisel plows. No-till farming methods avoid tillage for seedbed preparation as well as later weed control.

Seedbed preparation in gardens often involves secondary tillage via hand tools such as rakes and hoes. This may follow primary tillage (if any) by shovels, picks, or mattocks. Rotary tillers provide a powered alternative that takes care of both primary and secondary tillage.

The preparation of a seedbed may include:

1. The removal of debris. Insect eggs and disease spores are often found in plant debris and so this is removed from the plot. Stones and larger debris will also physically prevent the seedlings from growing.
2. Levelling. The site will have been levelled for even drainage.
3. Breaking up the soil. Compacted soil will be broken up by digging. This allows air and water to enter, and helps the seedling penetrate the soil. Smaller seeds require a finer soil structure. The surface the soil can be broken down into a fine granular structure using a tool such as a rake.
4. Soil improvement. The soil structure may be improved by the introduction of organic matter such as compost or peat.
5. Fertilizing. The nitrate and phosphate levels of the soil can be adjusted with fertilizer. If the soil is deficient in any micro nutrients, these too can be added.

The seedlings may be left to grow to adult plant.

== See also ==
- Category:Horticulture
- Open field
- Seed drill
- False seedbed
- Sowing
- Stale seed bed
- Stratification (botany)
