= Cultipacker =

Agricultural equipment for a smooth seedbed

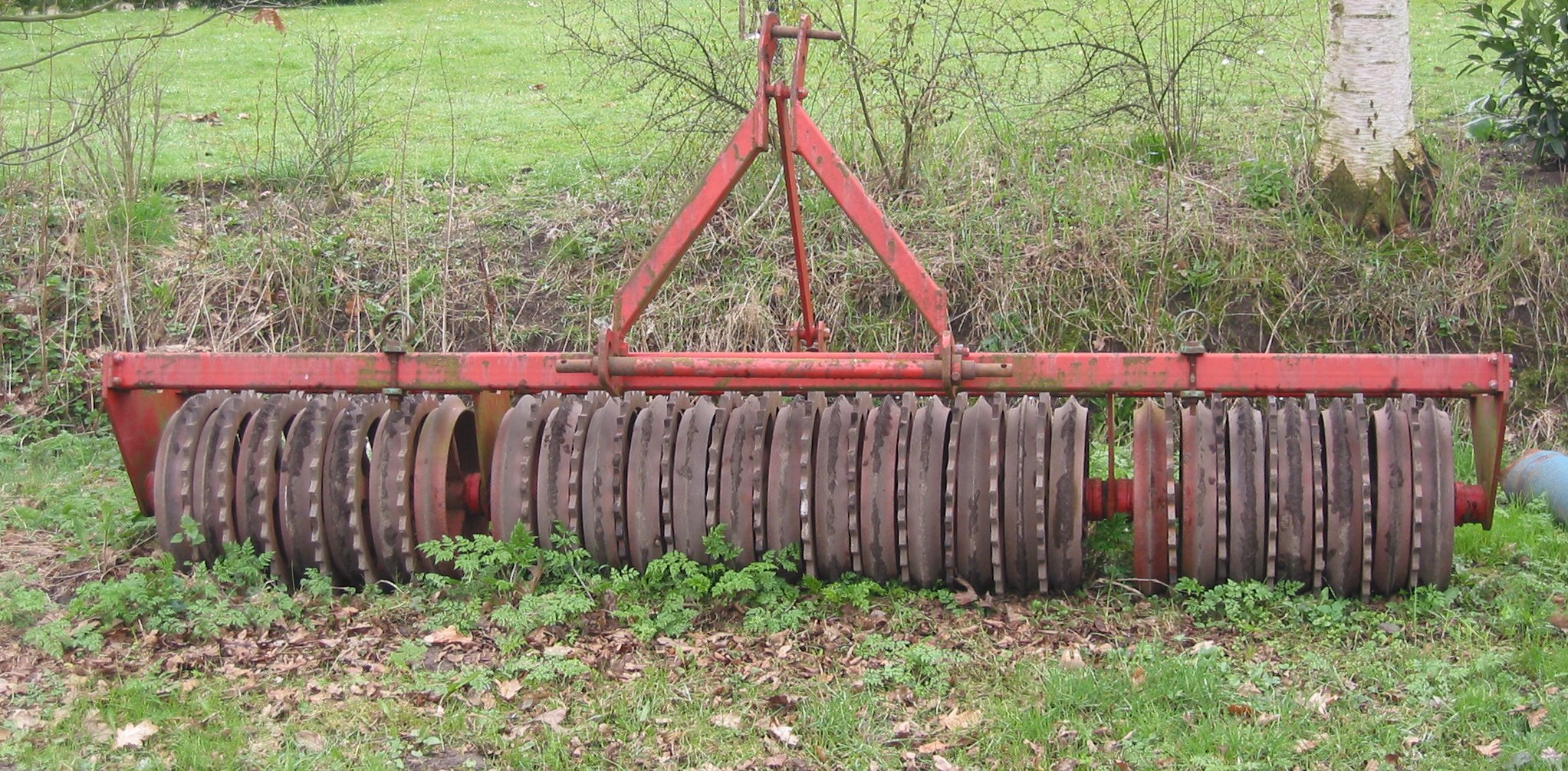
A ridged roller comprising many segments is usually called a Cambridge roller in the United Kingdom and a cultipacker in the United States; each name originated with a manufacturer in the respective country and evolved into the regionally prevalent name for the type.

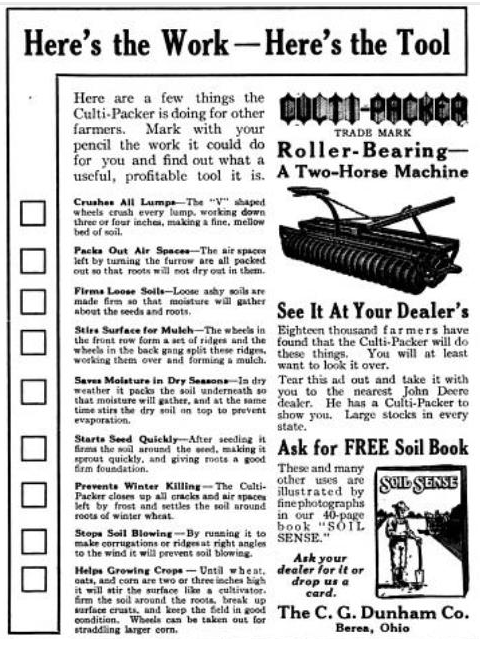
An advertisement for the Culti-Packer by the C.G. Dunham Company of Berea, Ohio, USA, in the April 24, 1915, issue of The Prairie Farmer, a farm newspaper. The earliest mentions of cultipackers in print date from around this time period. Ads for this company show single and double versions.

A cultipacker is a piece of agricultural equipment that crushes dirt clods, removes air pockets, and presses down small stones, forming a smooth, firm seedbed. Where seed has been broadcast, the roller gently firms the soil around the seeds, ensuring shallow seed placement and good seed-to-soil contact.

The term cultipacker is almost exclusively applied to ridged rollers, while the terms field roller or land roller may refer to either a smooth or a ridged roller. Some farmers treat the terms as mutually exclusive, but many others treat the ridged tools as a class of field rollers. For example, C.H. Wendel's Encyclopedia of American Farm Implements and Antiques covers the whole category as land rollers. The term cultipacker appeared in English around 1914 and probably originated as a brand name of the C.G. Dunham Company of Berea, Ohio, which advertised "Culti-Packer" models starting around that time. That company did not have the ridged-roller subcategory to itself by any stretch, as Wendel's book demonstrates, but for whatever reason, its name for its version stuck well in many minds. By the 1920s and ever since, it has been widely used in a genericized sense, at least in some regions of the U.S. if not nationwide. In Britain, an equivalent tool is usually called a Cambridge roller or Cambridge roll; D.J. Smith's Discovering Horse-drawn Farm Machinery says, "The Cambridge roll, named after its makers, was a ring roller made up of numerous equally spaced rings or ridges."

Despite the suggestion of soil compaction in the "packer" part of the name, cultipackers and other land rollers exert high pressure only on the high spots (such as clods); the baseline pressure at the rest of the footprint is not especially high, which is to say, not higher than a person's footprint pressure. A person intentionally stomping hard on a particular spot can pack the dirt tighter than a cultipacker packs it.
