= Disc harrow =

Farming equipment

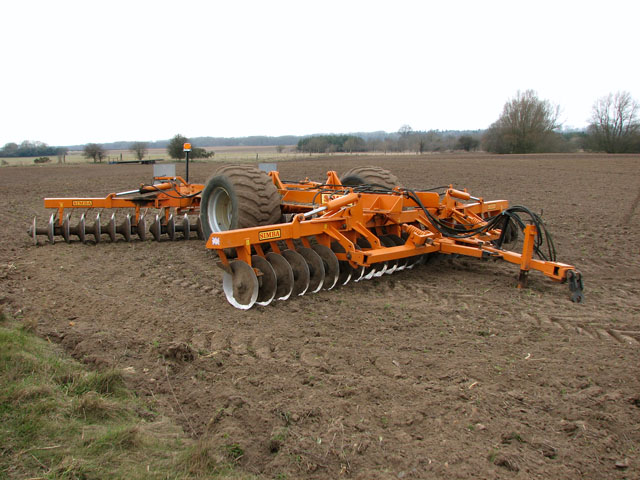
A Simba disk harrow

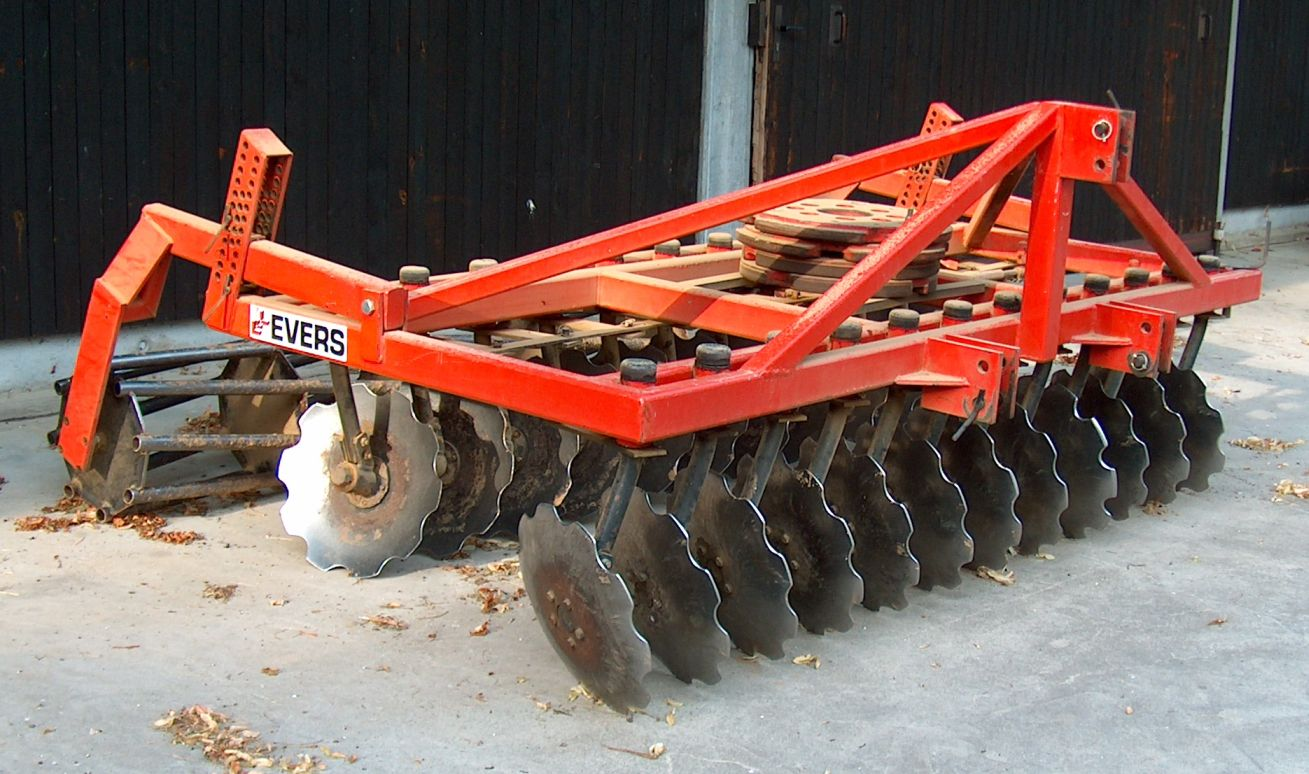
An Evers disk harrow

A disk harrow is a harrow whose cutting edges are a row of concave metal discs, which may be scalloped or set at an oblique angle. It is an agricultural implement that is used to till the soil where crops are to be planted. It is used to chop up unwanted weeds or crop residue. It is also one of the many soil cultivation implements alongside tillers and moldboard plows.

It consists of many carbon steel discs, and sometimes longer-lasting boron steel discs, which have many varying concavities and disc blade sizes and spacing (the choices of the latter being determined by the final result required in a given soil type) and which are arranged into two sections ("offset disk harrow") or four sections ("tandem disk harrow"). When viewed from above, the four sections would appear to form an "X" which has been flattened to be wider than it is tall. The discs are also offset so that they are not parallel with the overall direction of the implement. This arrangement ensures that the discs will repeatedly slice any ground to which they are applied. The concavity of the discs as well as their offset angle causes them to loosen and lift the soil that they cut.

== Name variations ==
In various regions of the United States, farmers call these implements just discs (or disks), and they reserve the word harrow for the lighter types of harrow, such as chain and tooth harrows. Therefore, in these regions, the phrase "plowing, disking, and harrowing" refers to three separate tillage steps. This is not any official distinction but is how farmers tend to speak.

It is also common, at least in the United States, to consider disc plows to be a separate class of implement from discs (disc harrows). The first is a true plow, which does primary tillage and leaves behind a rough surface, whereas the second is a secondary tillage tool.

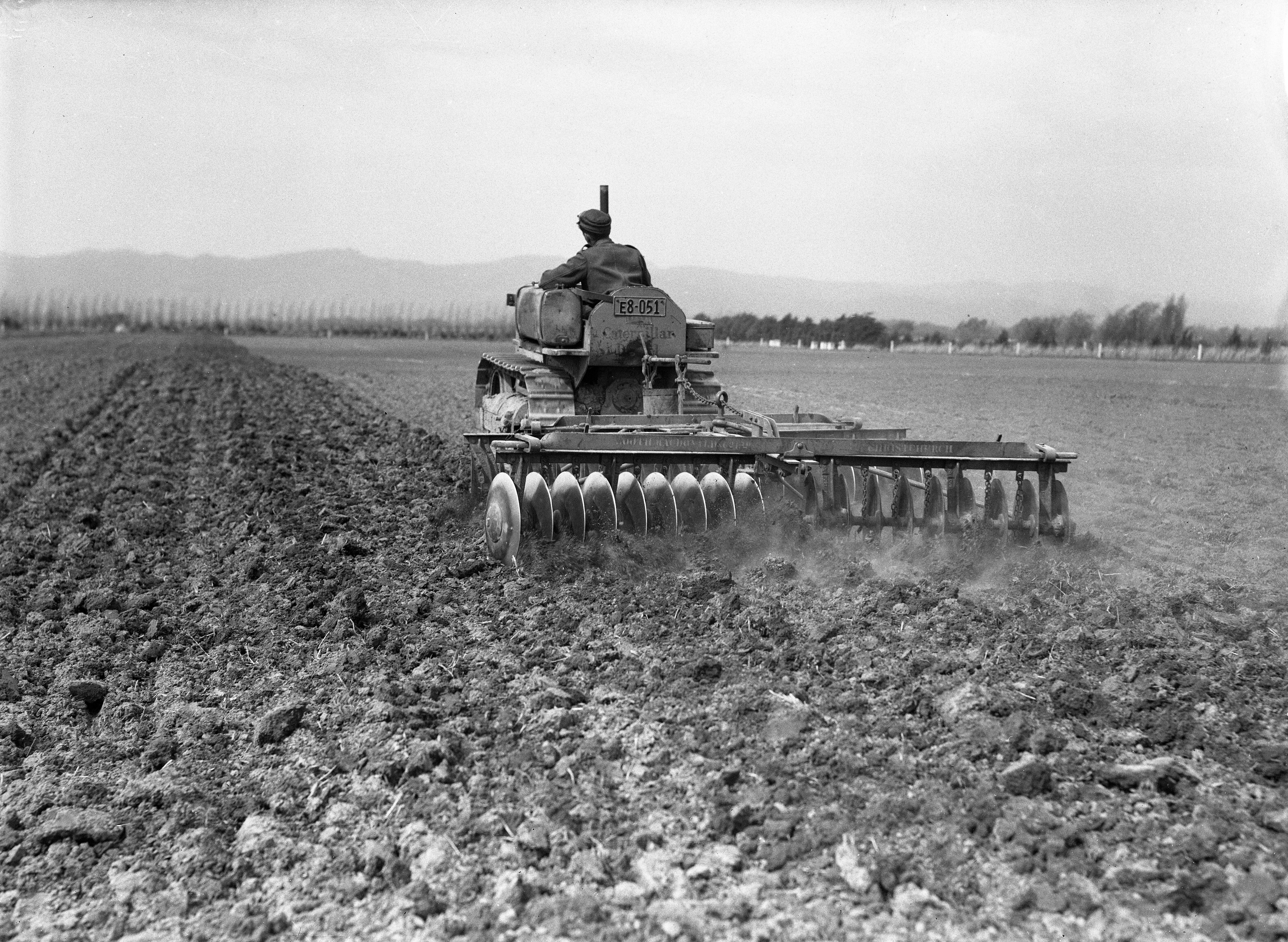
A two-way disc plough working at Canterbury Agricultural College, New Zealand, in 1948

== History ==
Before invention of the modern tractor, disc harrows typically consisted of two sections, which were horse-drawn and had no hydraulic power. These harrows were often adjustable so that the discs could be changed from their offset position. Straightening the discs allowed for transport without ripping up the ground; also, they were not as difficult to pull.

== Today ==
Modern disc harrows are tractor-driven and are raised either by a three-point lift or hydraulically by wheels. The large ones have side sections that can be raised vertically or that fold up to allow easier road transport or to provide better storage configurations.

== Uses ==
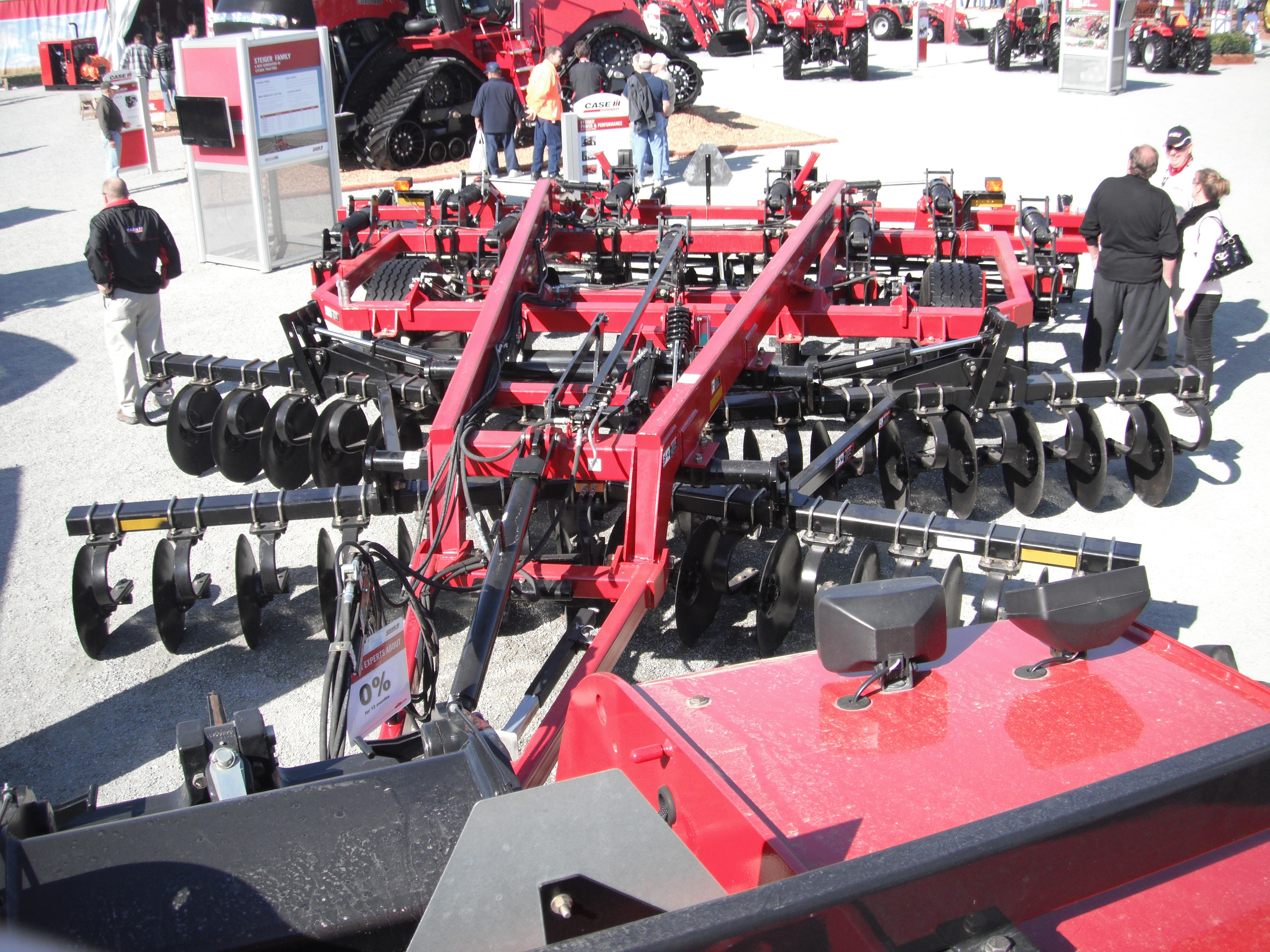
Disc harrow as part of a chisel plow by Case IH

Primary heavy duty disc harrows of 265 to 1,000 pounds (120 to 454 kg) per disc are mainly used to break up virgin land, to chop material/residue, and to incorporate it into the top soil. Lighter secondary disc harrows help completely incorporate residue left by a primary disc harrow, eliminate clumps, and loosen the remaining packed soil. The notched disc blades chop up stover left from previous crops, such as cornstalks. Disc harrows incorporate remaining residue into the top soil, promoting the rapid decay of the dead plant material. Disc harrows are also generally used prior to plowing in order to make the land easier to manage and work after plowing. Applying a disc harrow before plowing can also reduce clogging and allow more complete turning of the soil during plowing.

A disc harrow is the preferred method of incorporating both agricultural lime (either dolomitic or calcitic lime) and agricultural gypsum, and disc harrowing achieves a 50/50 mix with the soil when set correctly, thereby reducing acid saturation in the top soil and so promoting strong, healthy root development. Lime does not move in the soil, and this poses a critical challenge to sustainable zero-till farming, especially considering that chemical fertilizers are generally used by farmers around the world.

In the event of a wildfire, farmers will often use a disc harrow to quickly create a firebreak between fields or around structures by circling a structure or a field, thereby tilling under flammable stubble, stover, or residue to deprive the advancing fire of fuel.

== Secondary uses ==
Once worn down too small to be of further use in harrows, the hardened steel discs have been adapted to form the blades of hand tools for wildland firefighters, farmers, and trail-building crews.

== Offset disc harrow ==
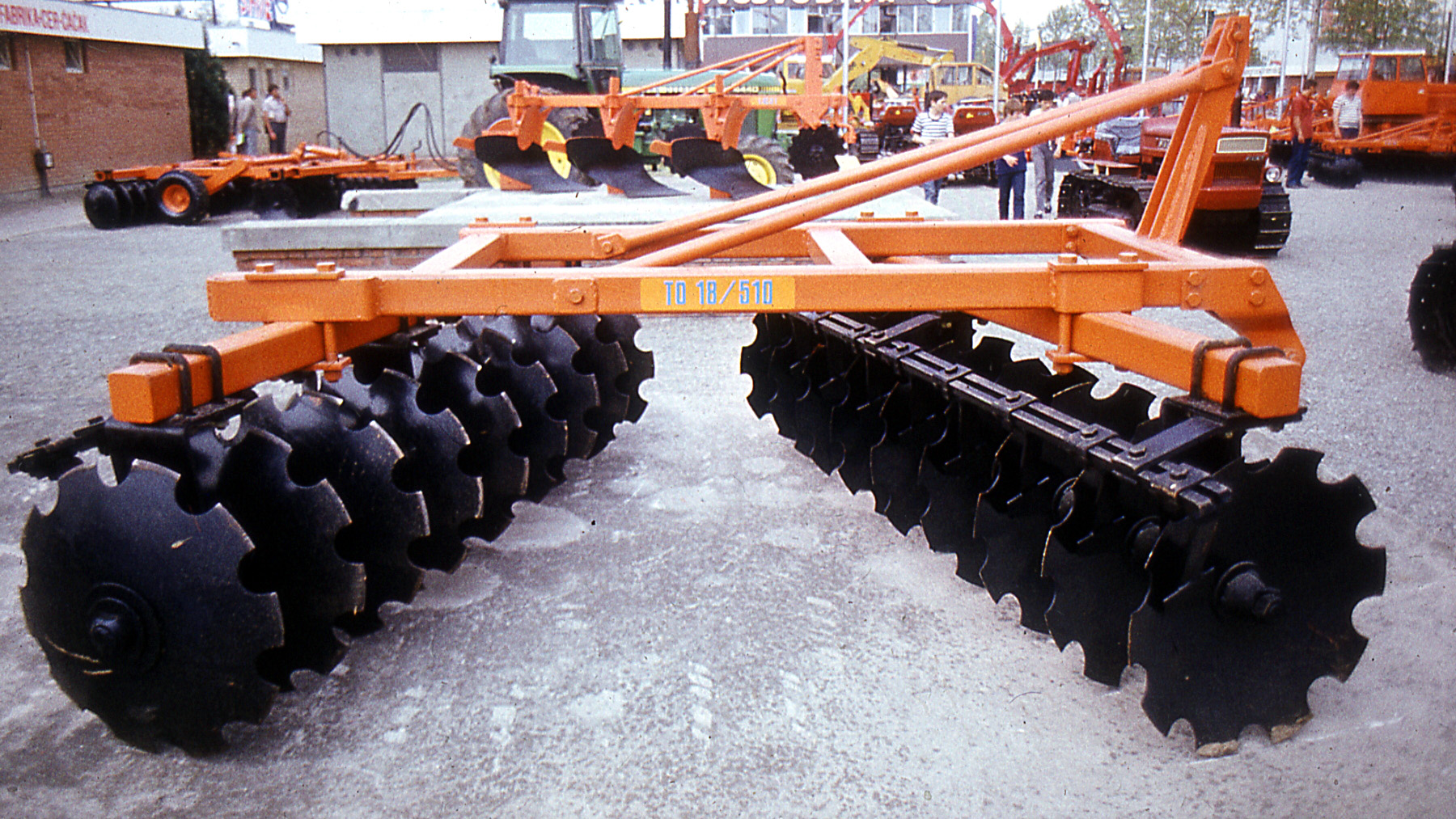
An offset (asymmetric) disc harrow

The heavy duty disc with large diameter disc blades of 26", 28", 30", 32", 36", and 40", and with increased disc spacings of 10", 14", and 18" are the primary tillage tools that are used to break virgin ground, to incorporate residue into the soil in preparation for a ripper / subsoiler, and to break up a compacted soil in order to increase soil aeration and to promote soil permeability in lower levels of the soil profile. Prior to a planting operation, a secondary disc harrow with narrow disc spacing of 8", 9", and even 10" with disc sizes ranging from 20", 22", 24", to 26" can be used. Other similar secondary tillage tine implements or rotary harrows are also widely used. When choosing secondary tillage equipment, soil type as well as soil moisture content at the time must be considered. Lighter secondary disc harrows are primarily used to break down soil clods into smaller pieces. By doing so, water penetrates more easily into the soil, soil aeration is increased, and the activity of soil biota is enhanced; the final result is a seed bed that is suitable for planting.

== See also ==
- Agricultural machinery
- Agriculture
- Cultivator
- Drag harrow
- Power harrow
