= Petty Plough =

The Petty Plough was a steerable plough developed by brothers Frank and Herbert Petty of Doncaster, Victoria, Australia in the early 1930s.

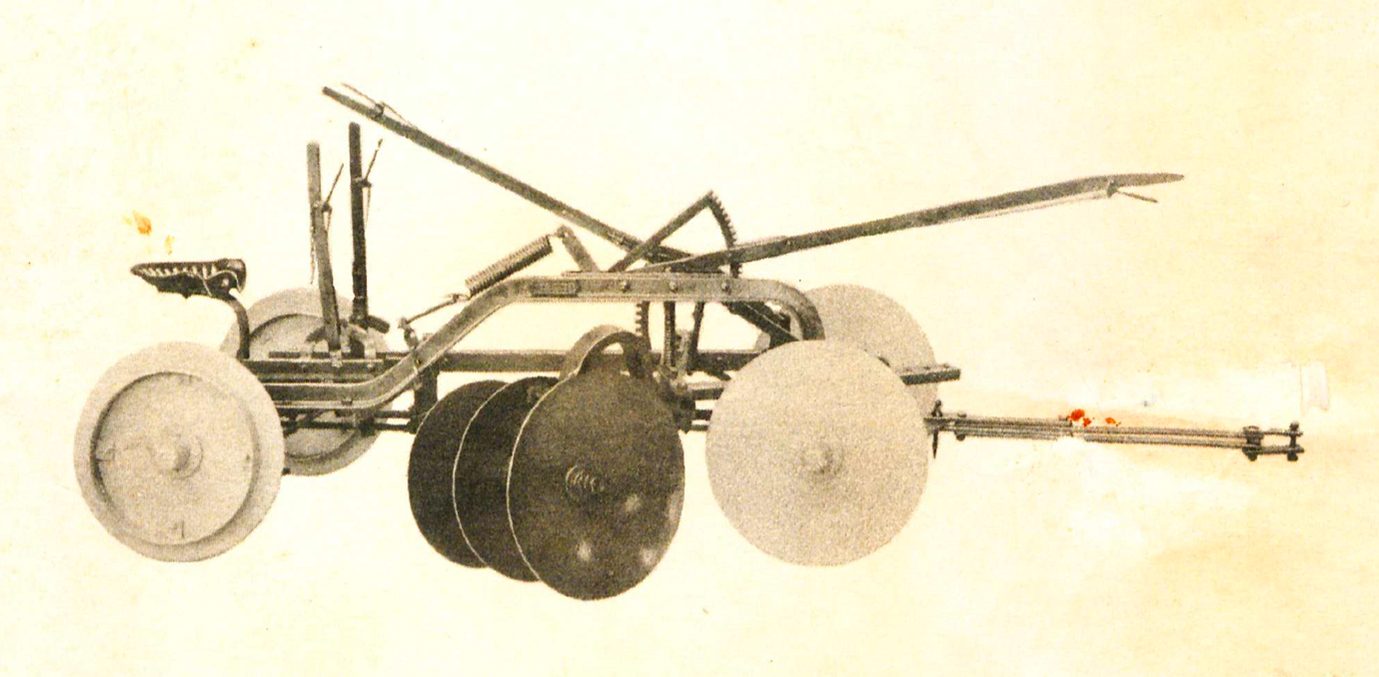
Tractor Drawn Petty Plough - Daniel Harvey Ltd, Bulletin 218-D

Petty Plough Film 1930s

== Background ==
Frank and Herbert Petty were orchardists, growing apples, pears, lemons, cherries and peaches. The entire orchard was cultivated. The Petty Plough was designed to plough between and around the fruit trees, working right up to the trees, eliminating the need for slow and tedious manual cultivation between the trees.

== Description ==
The Petty Plough could be pulled by two horses or by a tractor.

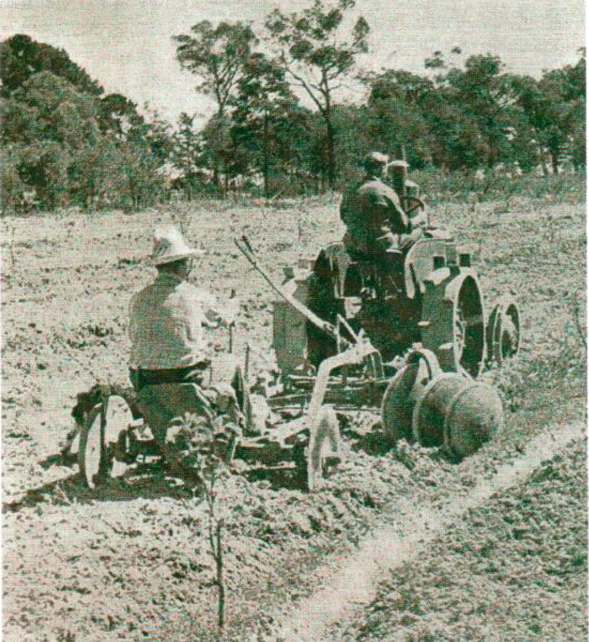
Petty Plough in operation

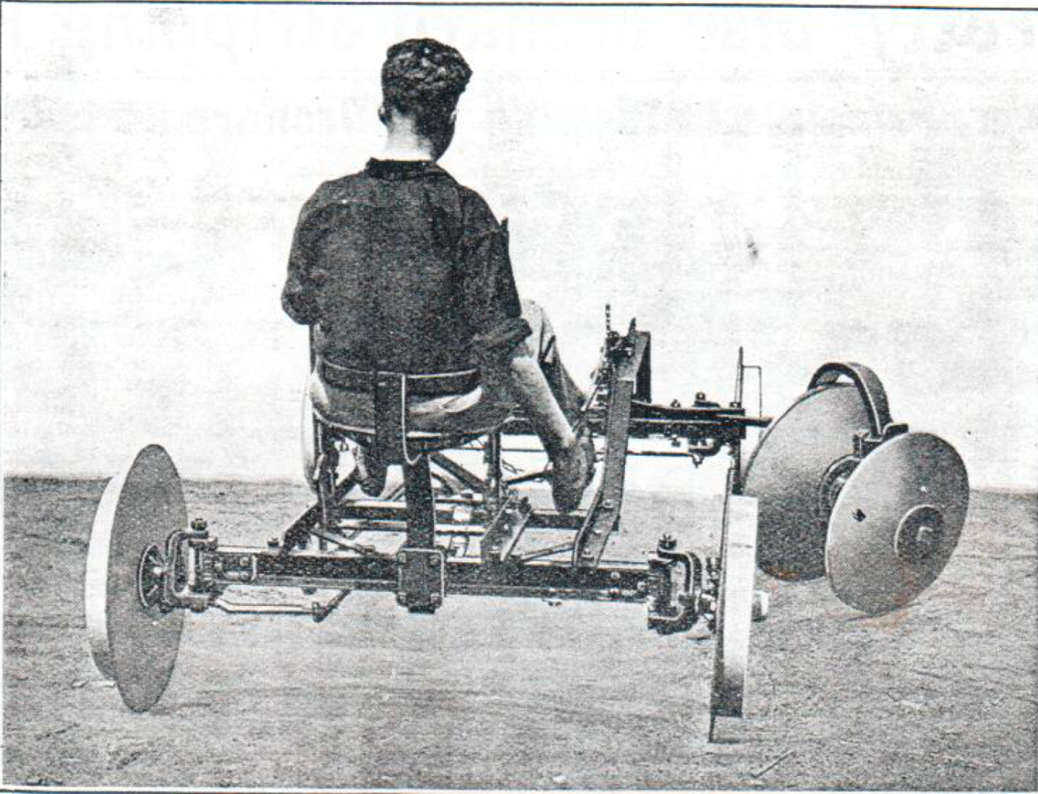
Petty Plough driven by Milton Petty

The Plough was fitted with lever and foot controls which operated four straight disc wheels. These were turned in and out of the trees as the operator desired. The wheels would sink into the ground about 2.5 inches, giving good control and preventing side slipping often associated with ploughing uneven surfaces. The cutting discs were on an extended floating arm, which followed the land they were working. Depth was regulated by two levers and the discs could be reversed to turn soil towards or away from trees. Soil was turned towards the trees in autumn and away from the trees in spring. This facilitated drainage in the wetter months and conserved water in the dryer months. The plough was manufactured in two types: light and heavy. The light weighed 7 cwt and the heavy 8 cwt 2 qrs.

It could be used as a single furrow, double furrow or triple furrow plough. The single furrow plough had one 23-inch diameter disc, the double furrow had one 23-inch disc and one 20-inch disc, while the triple furrow had three 23-inch discs.

"The Petty Orchard Disc Stripping Plough is the greatest labour saver of all time. It eliminates a lot of back-breaking work in cutting out the strips between trees. The operator is able to ride on the plow seat, thus sitting down and doing the job in comfort."

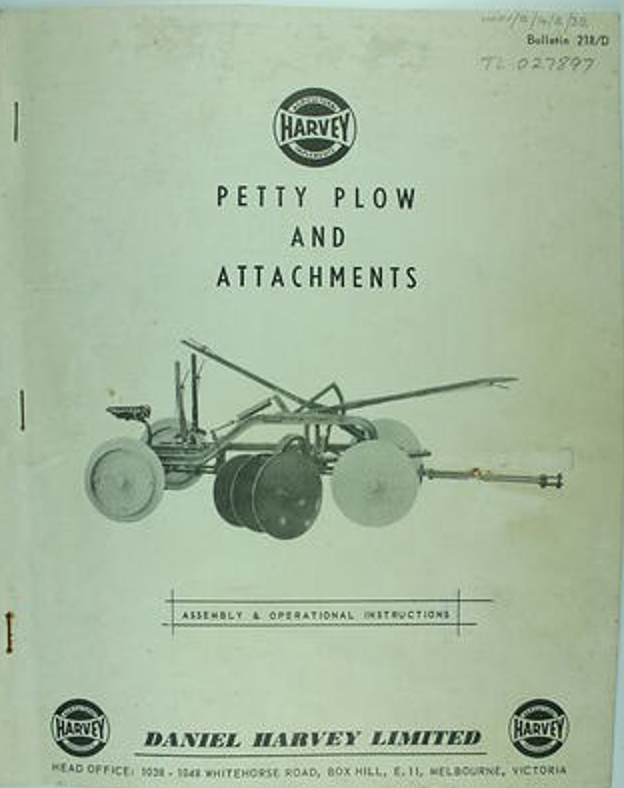
Petty Plough and Attachments User Manual

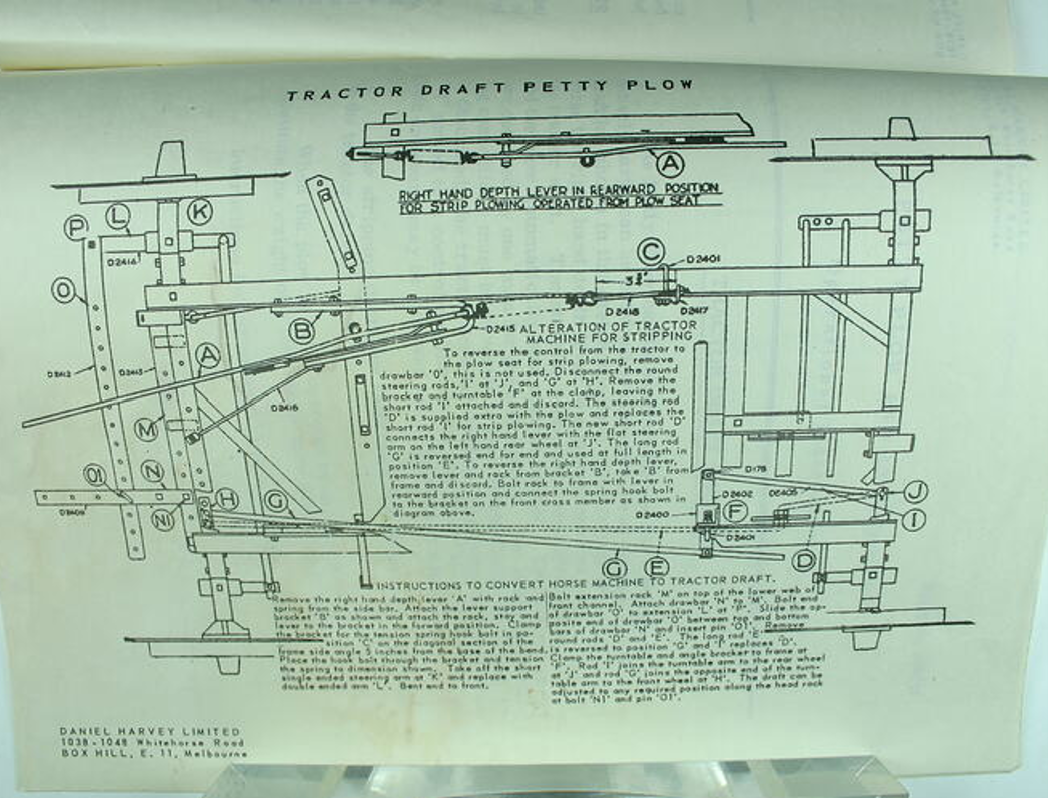
Petty Plough and Attachments User Manual

== Design ==
Frank Petty probably conceived the idea for a steerable plough, although the source of his inspiration is unknown. He invented many useful objects for use on his orchard. He developed and marketed the 'Whirlpool Spray Mix' a device not unlike a giant eggbeater which clamped to the inside of a drum of fruit spray, with a handle which when turned was designed to mix the spray.

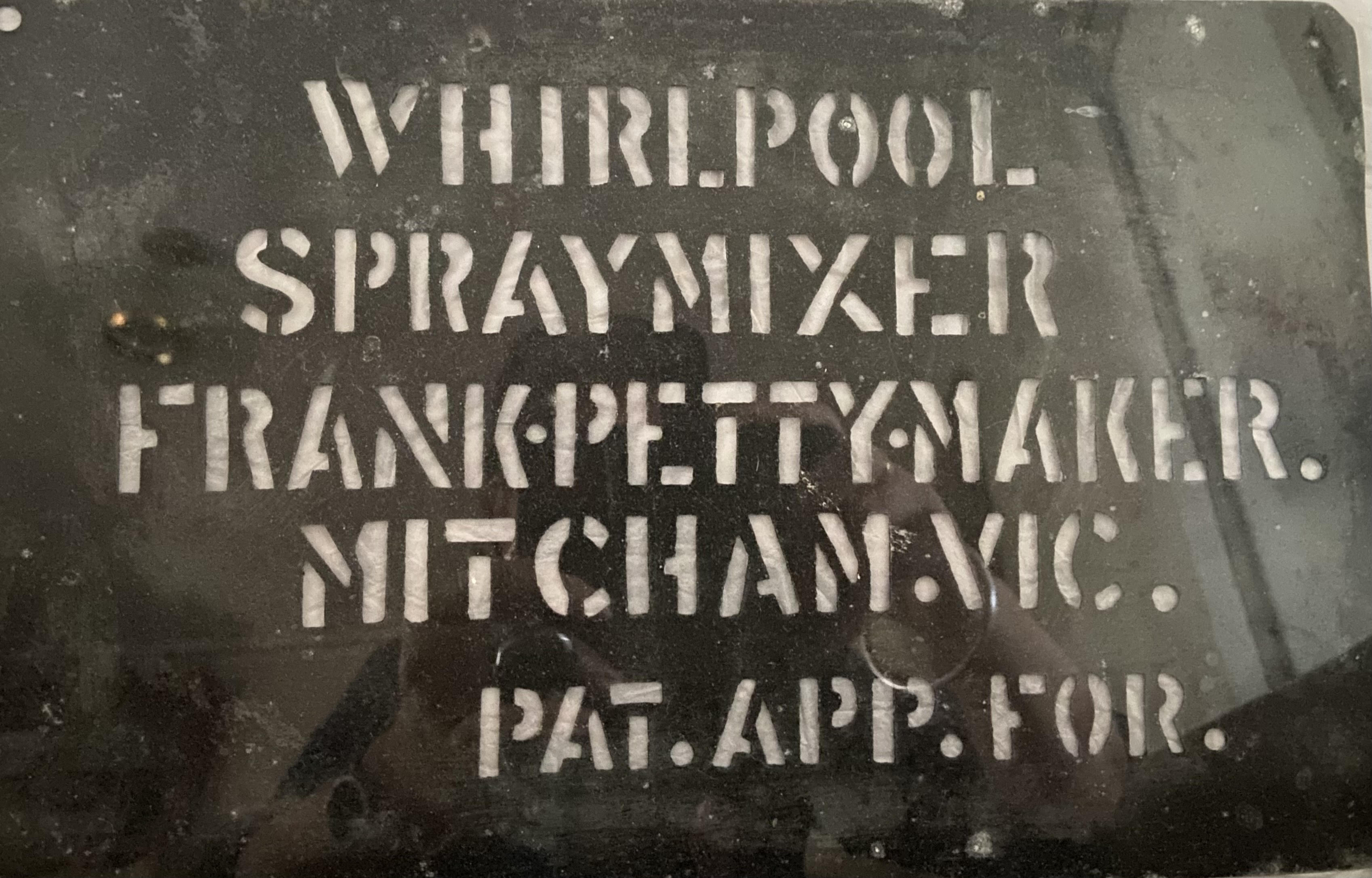
Frank Petty Whirlpool Spraymixer patent "awaiting approval" stencil

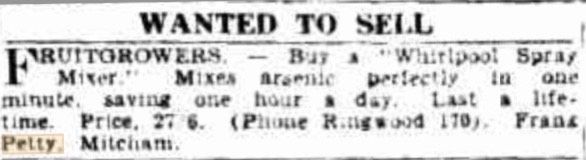
Frank Petty Whirlpool Spraymixer For Sale, 1933

On 10 October 1932, Frank made a 'Provisional Application' for a Plough and Cultivator. This lapsed in 1933.

It is thought that he asked his brother Herbert, who had greater mechanical skills, to assist him with the development of the plough. Another application dated 24 July 1933 was lodged in joint names. This resulted in an Australian Patent being advertised on 4 October 1934 and subsequently granted. The plough was also patented in the United States of America.

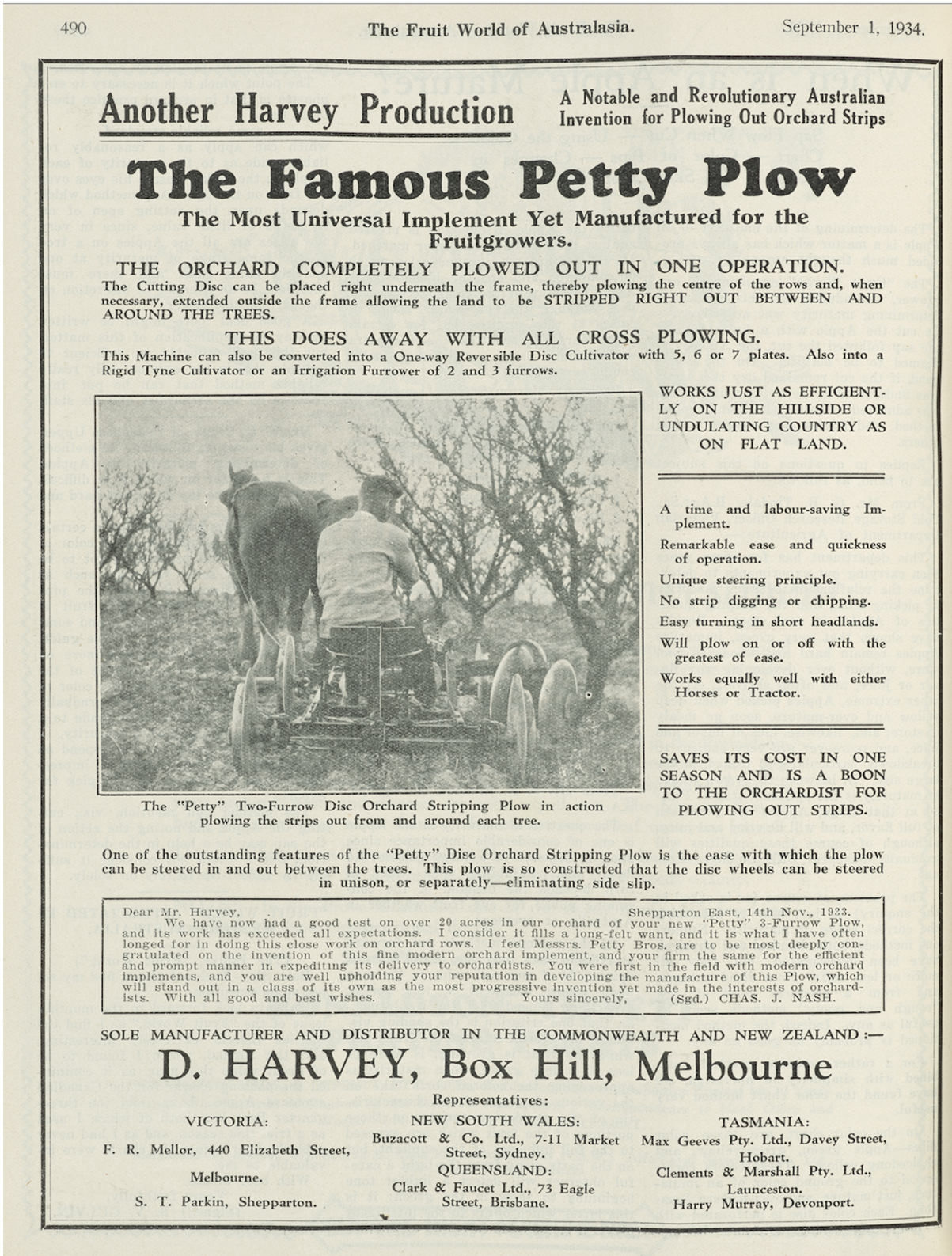
The Famous Petty Plough

Experimental versions of the plough went through several iterations. An early version involved the operator walking behind a device on which while all four wheels were steerable, the front and rear wheels turned together. The operator controlled the direction of the device by moving from side to side a long lever which projected tiller like from the rear of the device.

A subsequent prototype plough was constructed using the front axles from two T Model Fords. All four wheels were steerable. Front and rear wheels turned independently of each other. The tyres were removed, and the plough ran on the rims of the wheels, which had wooden spokes. The main structural members of the plough were made from 4-inch hardwood, joined at each end by specially made steel strips bolted to the timber. The operator sat on the plough and steered using a series of levers and foot controls.

The prototype sat for many years unused and forlorn under a row of pine trees on Frank's property. It was destroyed in a grass fire in the late 1960s.

The ploughs were manufactured by Daniel Harvey, a machinery maker located in Box Hill, a locality adjoining Doncaster under licence from Frank and Herbert Petty as the patent holders.

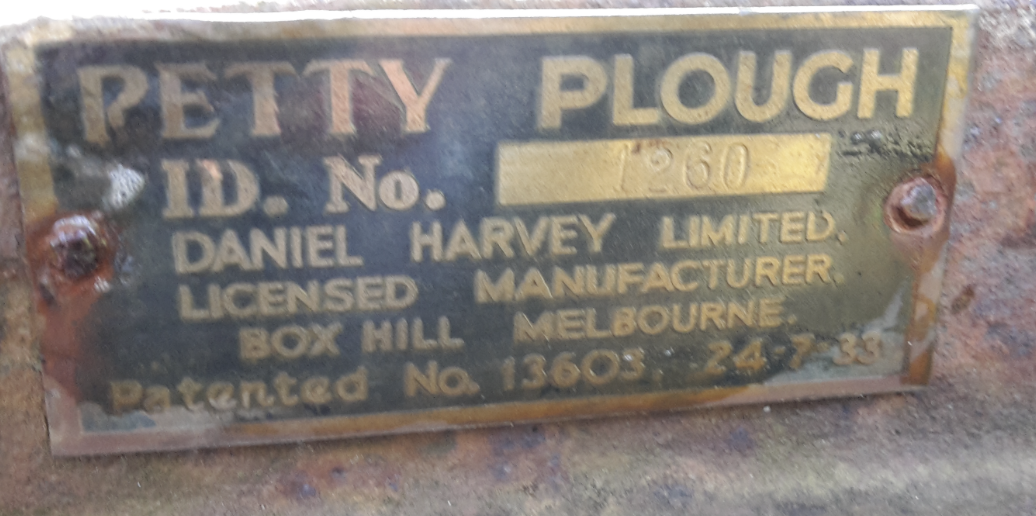
Petty plough serial number

The plough was widely used in South Eastern Australia including Tasmania, Western Australia, New Zealand, New Guinea, and Germany.

Changes in orchard management, specifically a change from cultivation (also referred to as tillage) to mowing, limited the usefulness of the plough from the 1960s onwards.
