= Index of agriculture articles =

This is an index of agriculture topics.

== A ==
- Agricultural Machinery
- Agricultural Science
- Agronomy
- Agroecology
- Agricultural soil science
- Agricultural engineering
- Agriculture in Canada
- Agricultural biotechnology

== B ==
- Biofertilizer
- Biotechnology
- Buckwheat
- Biodynamic agriculture
- Broadcast seeding

== C ==
- Cattle creep
- Conventional tillage
- Common Agricultural Policy
- compost
- Corn

== E ==
- Erosion
- Entomology

== F ==
- Farm
- Farmer's Voice
- Fertilizer
- Food systems
- Farming (disambiguation)
- Food Security

== G ==
- Goat
- Green Revolution
- Green Revolution in India
- Green Revolution (disambiguation)
- Green Revolution (Iran)

== H ==
- Harrow (tool)
- Hay
- History of agriculture
- Horticulture

== L ==
- List of agricultural universities and colleges
- List of agriculture ministries

== M ==
- Maize
- Minimum tillage
- Ministry of Agriculture, Fisheries and Food (United Kingdom)

== N ==
- No-till farming
- National Agricultural Law Center

== O ==
- Orchard
- Organic farming
- Optimum water content for tillage

== P ==
- Pig
- Plant Breeding
- Plant nutrition
- Plough
- Pomology

== S ==
- Selective breeding
- Soil Science
- Seed
- Seed contamination
- Seed treatment
- Sheep
- Silage
- Shifting cultivation

== T ==
- Theoretical production ecology
- Tillage
- Tillage Live
- Tractor

== U ==
- Urban agriculture
- United States National Agricultural Library

== W ==
- Weed
- Weed control

== Z ==
- Zero tillage

== See also ==
- Portal:Agropedia
- Agriculture
