= Puddling (agriculture) =

Tillage of rice paddies while flooded

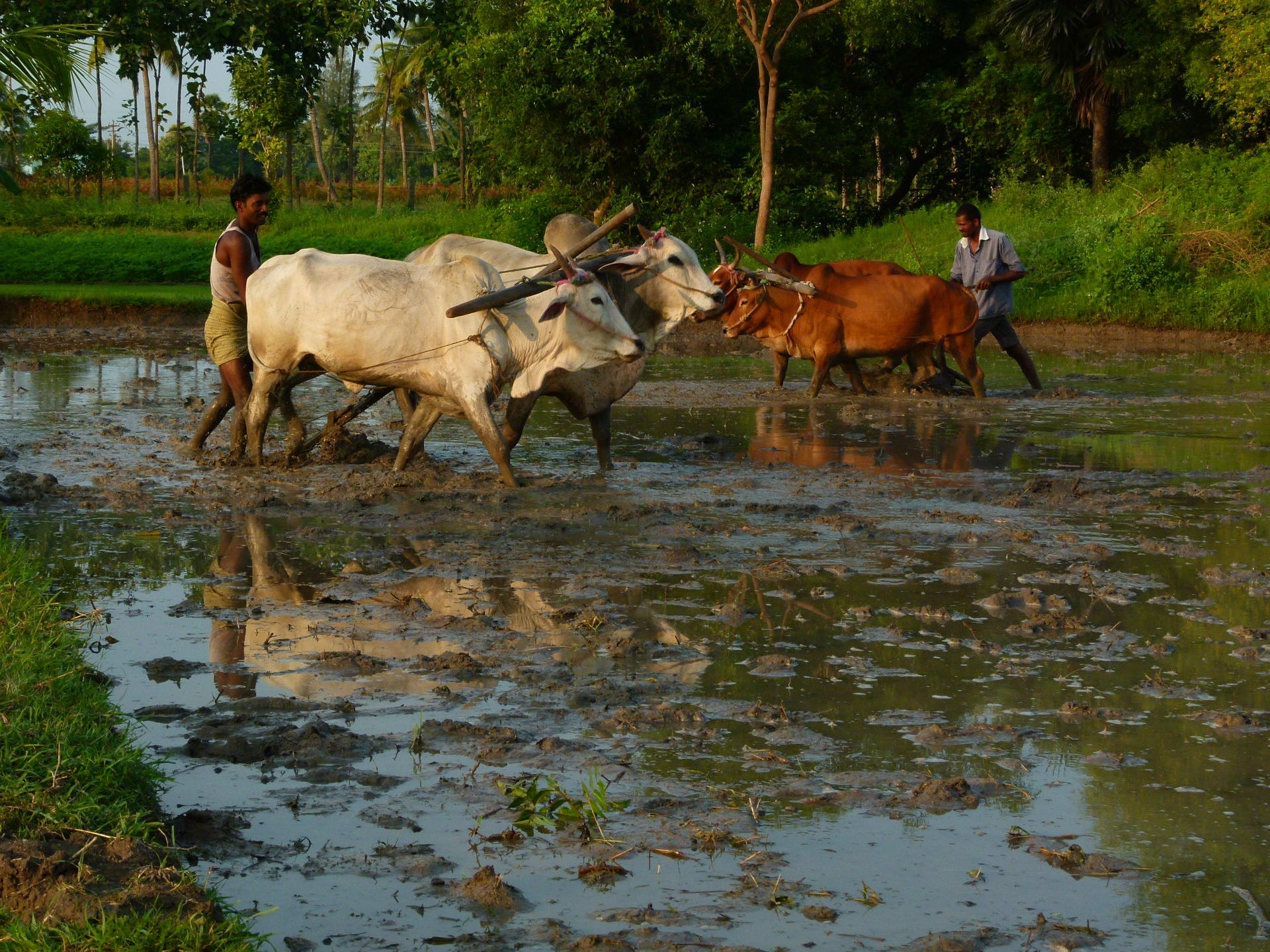
Puddling operation in Tamil Nadu, India

Puddling is the tillage of rice paddies while flooded, an ancient practice that is used to prepare for rice cultivation. Historically, this has been accomplished by dragging a weighted harrow across a flooded paddy field behind a buffalo or ox, and is now accomplished using mechanized approaches, often using a two-wheel tractor.

== Definition ==
The term has been formally defined by Buehrer and Rose (1943) as “the destruction of the aggregated condition of the soil by mechanical manipulation within a narrow range of moisture contents above and below field capacity (0.3 bars), so that soil aggregates lose their identity and the soil is converted into a structurally more or less homogeneous mass of ultimate particles.”

== Effects ==
Puddling reduces the percolation rates of water by churning the clay particles and making them close many of the soil pores. Puddling reduces the oxygen in the submerged soil and inhibits most plants other than rice and those that can withstand submergence. It hastens organic matter decomposition and mineralization of organic nitrogen in the initial month. Puddling in rainfed agriculture causes the soil to shrink when drying and impede rice root development and also delays drying when dry soil crops are planned for rotations following the rice harvest.

Combined with good agricultural practices puddling is the norm in flooded rice systems. It is however not sustainable in rotations with maize or wheat. This has led to the development alternative soil management systems where the minimum soil disturbance via minimum tillage, strip-till and no-till practices can not only stop a soil's degradation but also generally improve the soil's health ( regenerative agriculture).
