= Mulch-till =

Seeding method

In agriculture, mulch tillage (or mulch-till) is a seeding method where a hundred percent of the soil surface is disturbed by tillage, crop residues are mixed with the soil and a certain amount of residues remain on the soil surface. A great variety of cultivator implements are used to perform mulch-till. The method falls under the umbrella term of conservation tillage in the United States.

Mulch is material to regulate heat. This is done by covering it with any material like wood chips, straw, leaves or food waste.
