= Dawn Equipment Company =

- Company type: Private
- Industry: Heavy equipment (Agribusiness)
- Founded: Sycamore, Illinois, U.S. (1992)
- Founder: James Bassett
- Headquarters: Sycamore, Illinois, U.S.A.
- Key people: Joseph M. Bassett, President; Rodney J. Arthur, Prod. Devel. Moses R. Cruz, Production; Justin Landeck, Eng.
- Products: Row crop tools, strip-till tools, no-till attachments
- Website: www.dawnequipment.com

Dawn Equipment Company is an American corporation founded in 1992, and based in Sycamore, Illinois, where the company's factory and administrative center is. Dawn is a manufacturer of tools for row crop planters, as well as fertilizer openers, and strip-till systems.

As of 2009, Dawn Equipment Company supplies more than 2,000 dealerships in several countries, including the United States, Australia, Canada, and France. Dawn's corporate color is navy blue, typically set on a white backdrop.

== Products ==
Dawn's original product line was limited to "screw-adjust" row cleaners. As the company has grown, so has its product offerings. As of 2015, Dawn holds a number of patents and manufactures several varieties of agricultural products including: Trashwheels row cleaners, Curvetine closing wheels, row unit mounted coulters, the Gfx hydraulic trailing-arm floating row cleaner, the Rfx Automated Electro-Hydraulic Planter Row Unit Down-Pressure System, the Cfx Electro-Hydraulic fertilizer opener, the Anhydra Universal fertilizer applicator, and the Pluribus strip-till System.

In 2014 Dawn Equipment Company launched a new division, DawnBiologic www.dawnbiologic.com, which focuses on the development of tools for sustainable agricultural practices, and the development of new methods of low impact agriculture indicative of the broader soil health movement. DawnBiologic tool systems include: The ZRX Electro-Hydraulic Cover Crop Roller/Crimper, the FreeFARM line of customizable row crop tools, and the DuoSeed Cover Crop Inter-Row Seeder.

All Dawn products are manufactured in the United States of America, and raw materials are sourced through American companies. All Dawn equipment is powder coated black, and can be recognized by the unique screw-adjust handle which regulates height on most varieties of trashwheels row cleaners.

== Gallery ==
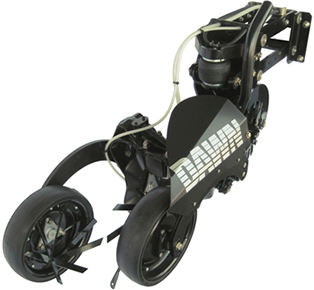
Dawn Pluribus strip-till unit

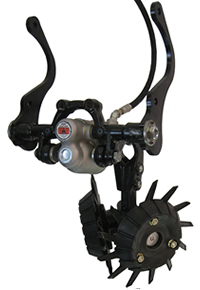
Dawn Ground Effects (Gfx) row cleaner

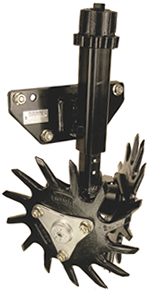
Dawn trashwheels (1130A-12.75 & 1140-2)

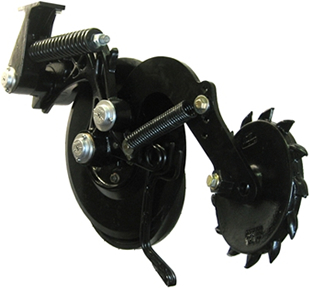
Dawn 3004 fertilizer opener

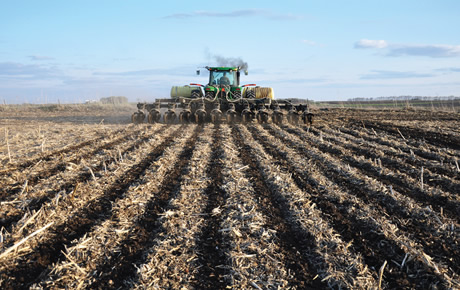
Dawn Pluribus strip-till system in the field

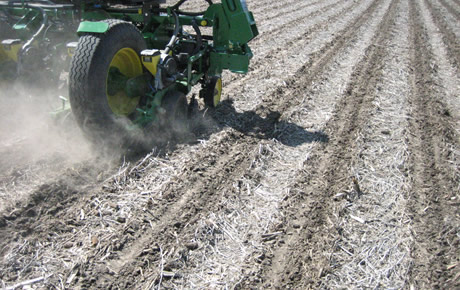
Dawn Gfx & Curvetines in the field

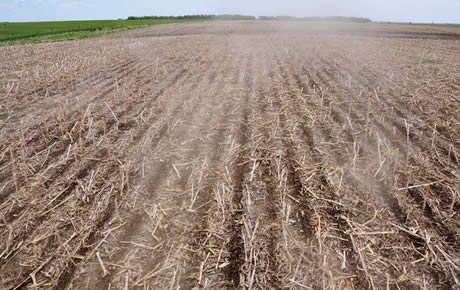
Dawn trashwheel in the field

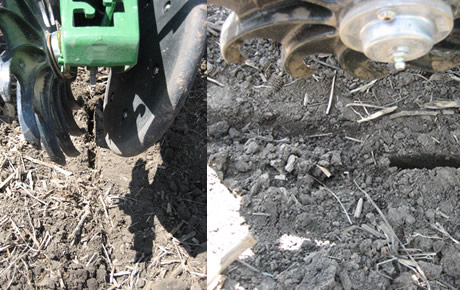
Dawn Curvetine in the field

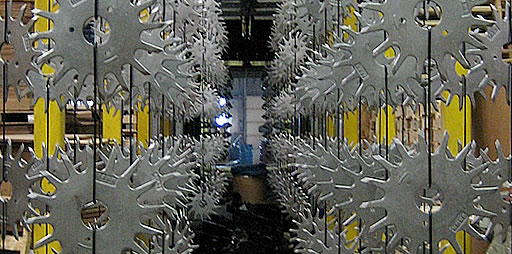
Dawn Equipment trashwheels ready for powder coating in Sycamore, Illinois

Planters of the following manufacturers are compatible with Dawn row crop tools:

- John Deere (series: 7000, 7100, 7200, 7300, 1700–1790)
- Case IH (series: 800, 900, 1200–1250)
- Harvest International Toolbar
- Kinze (series: 2000, 3000)
- AGCO/White (series: 5000, 6000, 8000)
- Monosem (Series: NG Plus)
- Gaspardo
