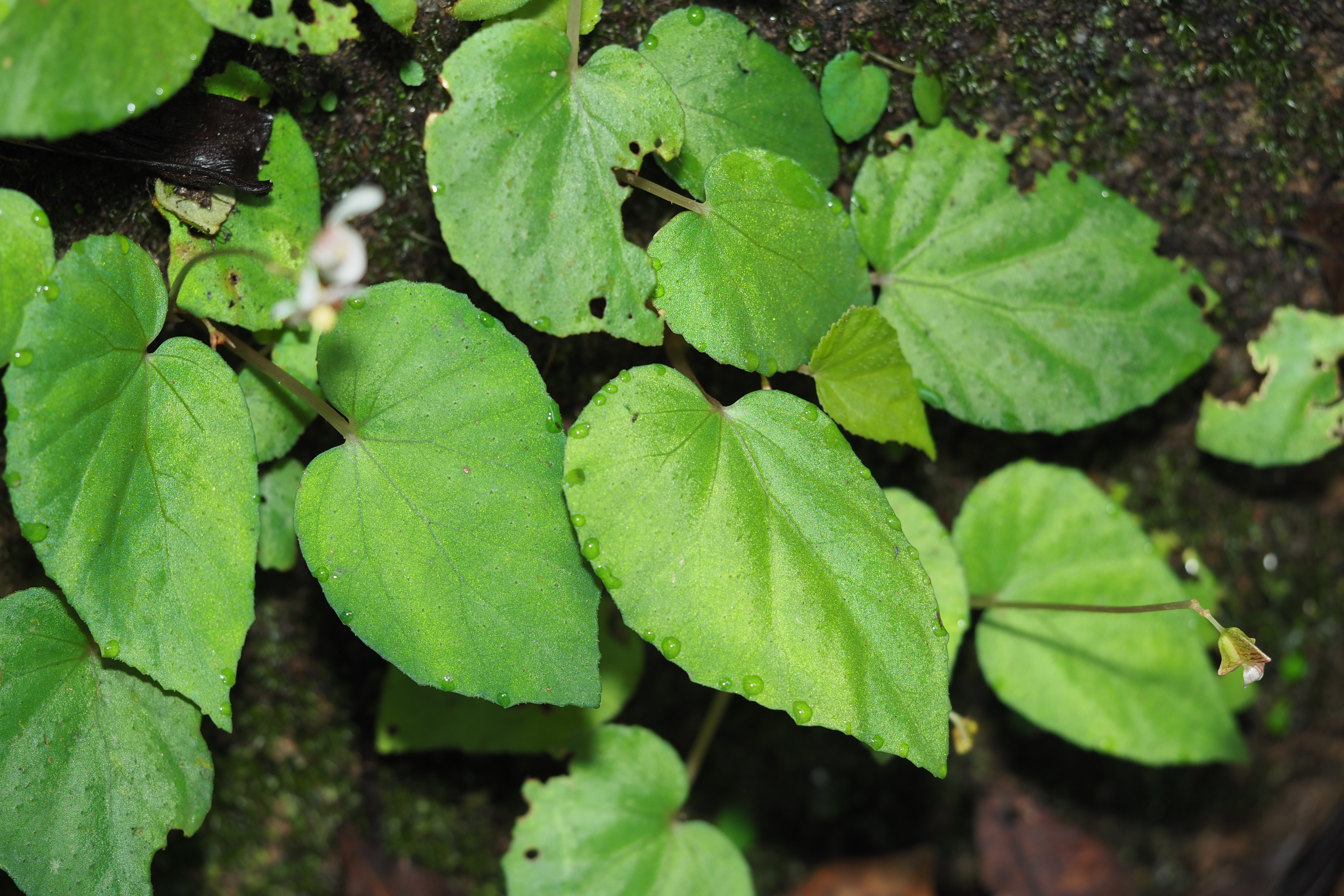

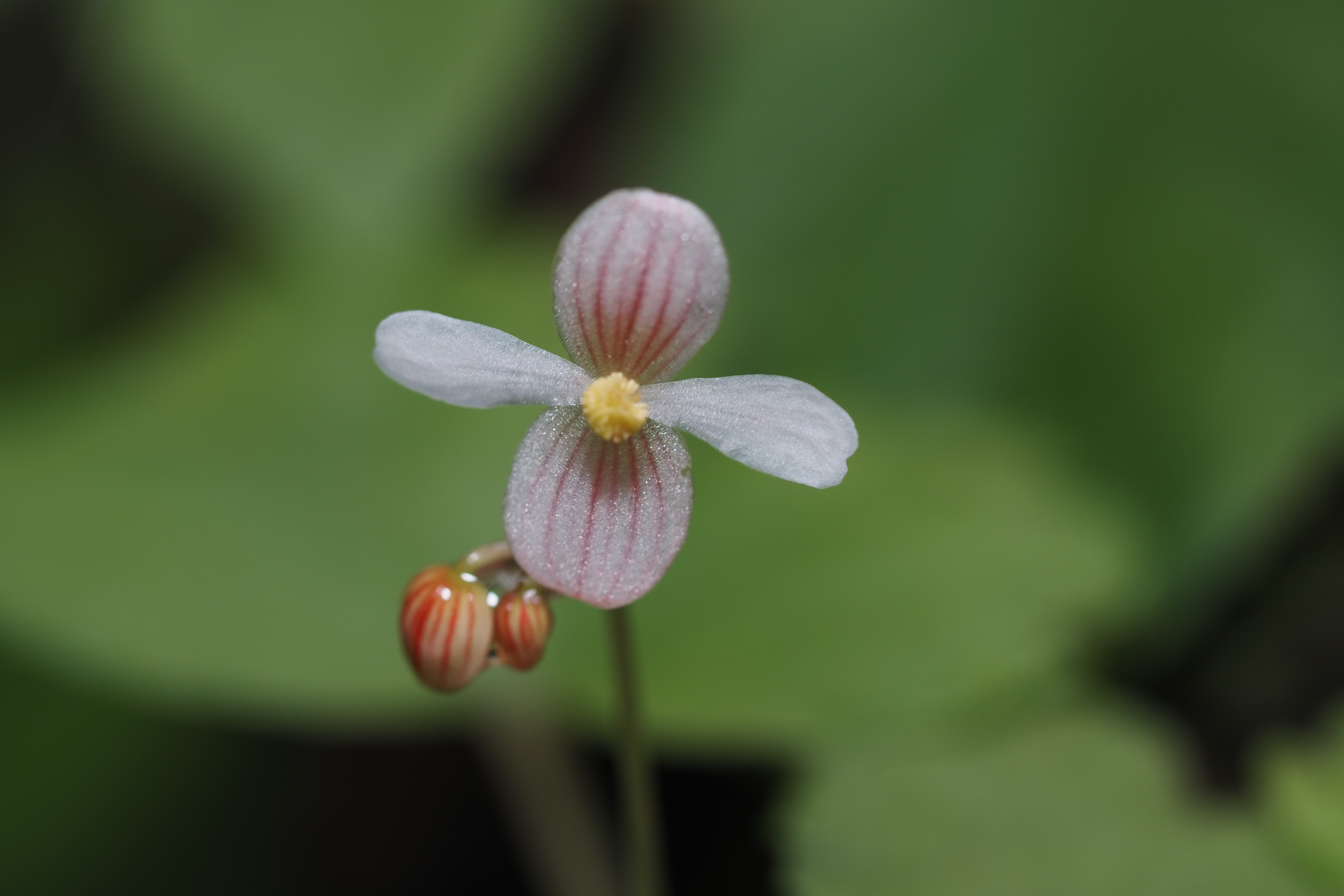
- Male flower

Scientific classification
- Kingdom: Plantae
- Clade: Embryophytes
- Clade: Tracheophytes
- Clade: Angiosperms
- Clade: Eudicots
- Clade: Rosids
- Order: Cucurbitales
- Family: Begoniaceae
- Genus: Begonia
- Species: B. phoeniogramma

Binomial name
- Begonia phoeniogramma Ridl.

= Begonia phoeniogramma =

Species of flowering plant

Begonia phoeniogramma, also known as the red striped begonia, is a species of tuberous flowering plant in the family Begoniaceae found in Peninsular Malaysia. It was described by Henry Nicholas Ridley in 1917.

== Description ==
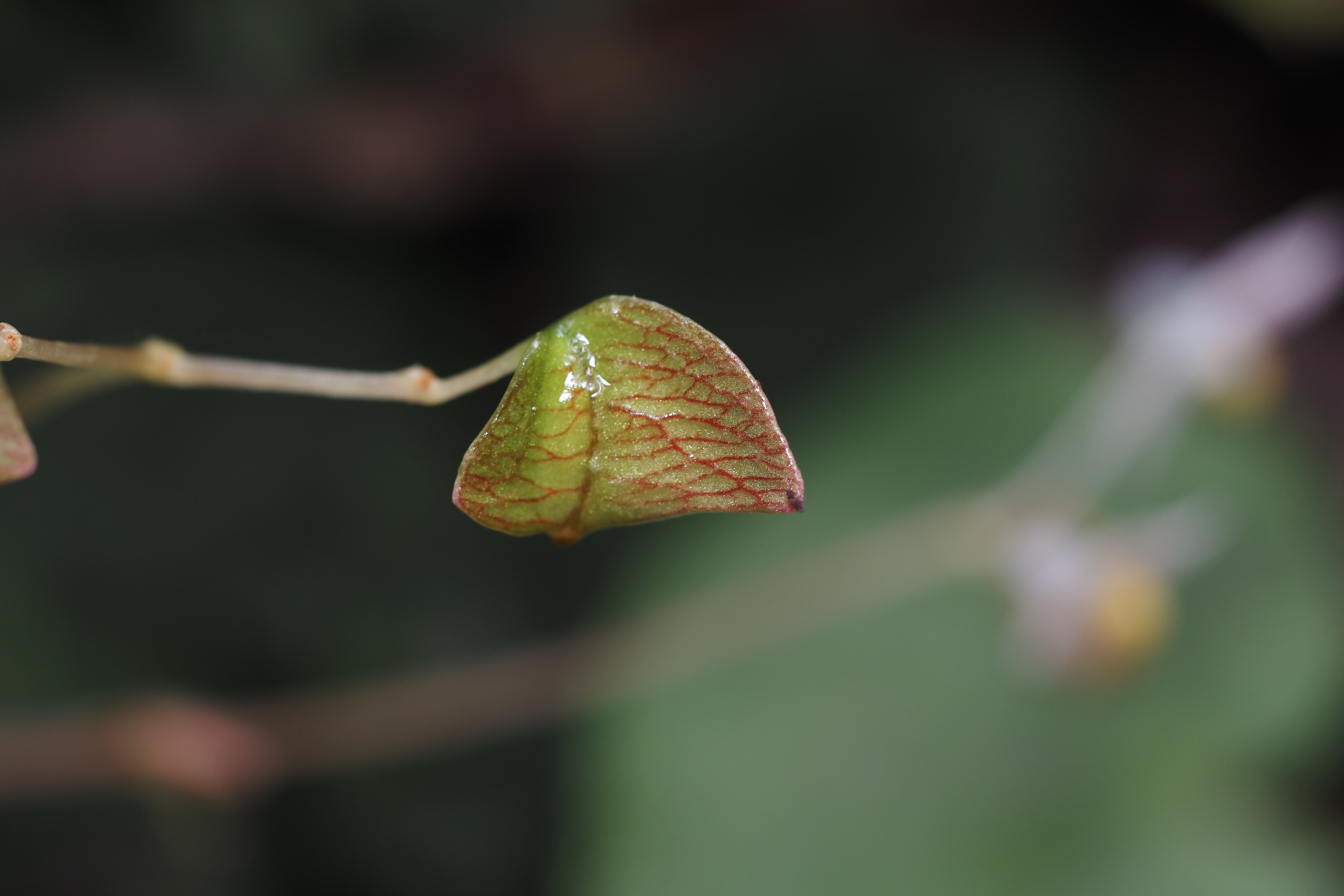
Immature fruit

Begonia phoeniogramma is a small herbaceous plant around 10-15 cm tall with a small tuber that is 12 mm long by 14 mm wide. Plants consist of erect, slender and succulent stems without hairs that are a pale translucent reddish brown, bearing similar coloured ovate tipped stipules with smooth margins around 5-6 mm by 3-4 mm.

Leaves measure to about 8.5-19 cm by 6.5-12 cm and are strongly asymmetric, glossy, ovate with acuminate to acute to elongate tips and a rounded, heart-shaped base. The margins of the leaves are undulate, while leaf venation is palmate-pinnate. B. phoeniogramma leaves exhibit polymorphism, varying from being plain green on both sides of the leaf, being dark green dorsally with blue iridescence and pale white, deep red or magenta ventrally, to having pale green or dark green leaves with grey-green silvery spots on top.

Plants possess a pale reddish brown cyme inflorescence held up by a 5-9 cm long peduncle bearing both male and female flowers (monoecy). Both sexes bear lanceolate or ovate greenish red bracts with red stripes. Male flowers consist of four hairless white tepals with the two outer obovate tepals having red veins that are raised as ribs on the outer surface; the inner two tepals narrowly obovate and purely white. The stamens of the male flower are many, forming globular (globose) clusters.

Female flowers, however, have five to seven pale pink tepals with raised red stripes. The ovaries above the female flowers are green with reddish veins on each of its unequal three wings and are about 5-8 mm long. The resulting fruit capsule is 10-13 mm by 21-22 mm in size, and hangs from a fine and hair-like stalk. The largest wing measures around 10-17 mm wide, while the smaller two are 3-5 mm wide. Seeds are around 0.25 mm and barrel-shaped.

== Habitat and ecology ==
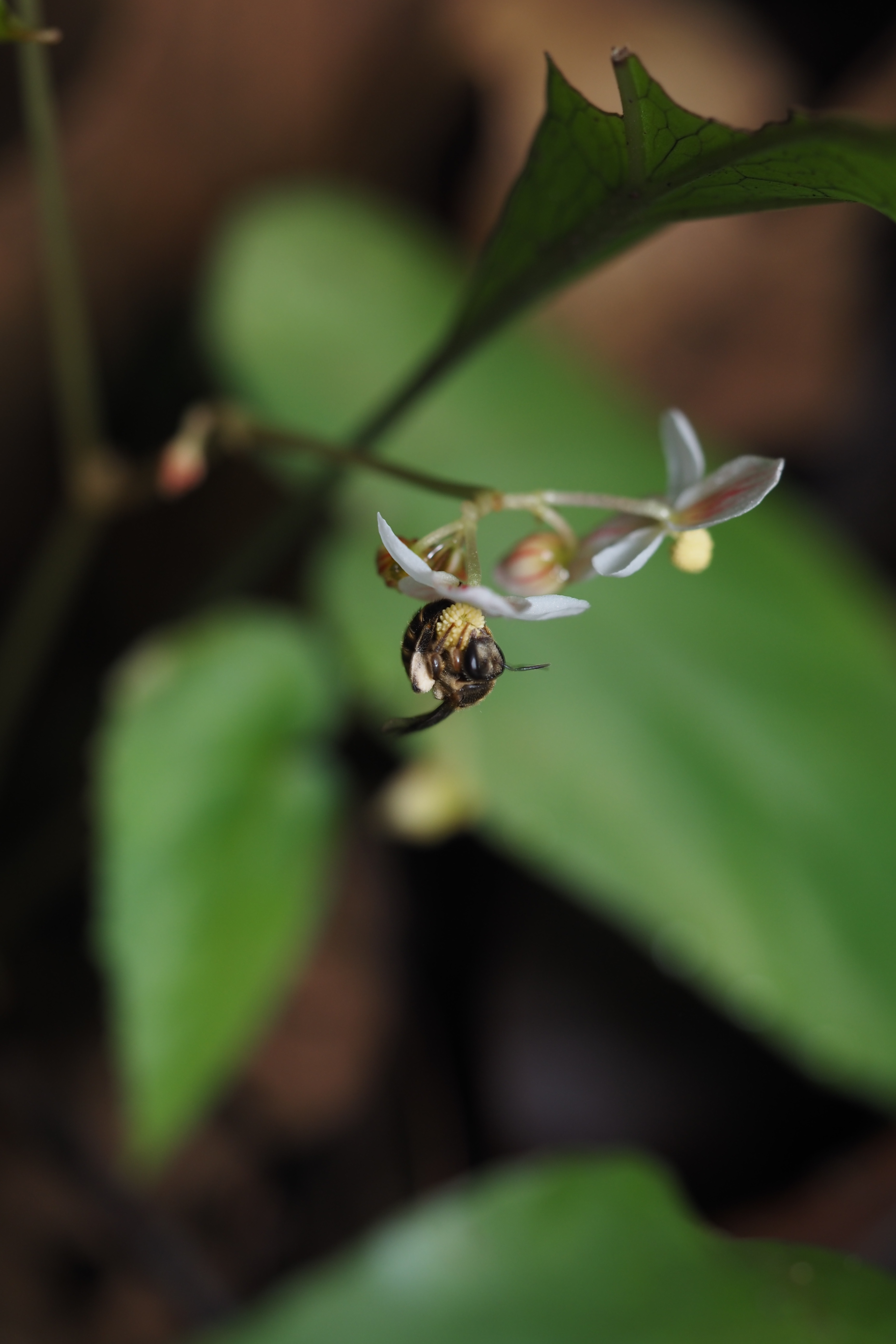
Nomia (Maculonomia) sp. on a male flower

Begonia phoeniogramma is restricted to the lowland forests of Selangor, mainly the forested areas of Gombak, Sungai Lalang and Sungai Buloh, with the exception of a population in Bentong, Pahang and a population in Mount Tampin, Negeri Sembilan. In Batu Caves, it inhabits steep earth-covered slopes and shaded scree.

In the wild, pollination is presumed to be carried out by stingless bees that visit the flowers. Individual plants produce their first true leaves three to four weeks after sowing, and are considered to be mature once the leaves reach a width of 5 cm. Variegation in the form of silver-grey leaf spots displayed by some individuals in Batu Caves and Gabai Waterfall seems to be selectively neutral and play no adaptive role.

=== Threats ===
Begonia phoeniogramma is considered as near threatened by the Malaysia Plant Red List due to a combination of threats stemming from human development and tourism.

== Taxonomy and nomenclature ==
Begonia phoeniogramma is placed under Begonia sect. Parvibegonia, which includes species like B. tenuifolia. Within the section, B. phoeniogramma, together with B. elisabethae, B. integrifolia, and B. variabilis were found to belong within one major clade.

B. phoeniogramma was first collected in Batu Caves and thought mistakenly as B. paupercula by botanist Henry Nicholas Ridley. However, upon seeing the paratype of B. paupercula in Kew Herbarium, Ridley had realized that it was a separate species. Subsequently, in 1917, it was described and published in the Journal of the Straits Branch of the Royal Asiatic Society. The specific epithet, phoeniogramma, is in reference to the red-striped flowers.
