= Stubble-mulching =

Stubble-mulching refers to leaving the stubble or crop residue essentially in place on the land as a surface cover during a fallow period. Stubble-mulching can prevent soil erosion from wind or water and conserve soil moisture.
