= Advance sowing =

Agricultural method

Advance Sowing (also known as "no kill cropping") is an agricultural method developed by Bruce Maynard in 1996 in NSW, Australia that allows the production of annual crops from perennial grasslands. It involves dry-sowing crops directly into existing pastures without using tillage, fertilizer or chemicals.

== Principles ==
Advance Sowing has 5 major principles:

1. Sowing is done when the topsoil is dry.
2. Coulter type sowing equipment must be used.
3. No Herbicides or pesticides are applied at any stage.
4. No Fertilizers are applied at any stage.
5. Grazing management must be good.

The rationale behind the method is to produce crops without simplifying the biodiversity. All other commonly used sowing methods of cropping rely on eliminating some or all of the plant and animals present to create an advantage for the growing crop. Advance sow relies on complementarity of plant/animal interactions to produce biomass that can be utilised directly for human consumption or fed to animals.

No Kill Cropping offers opportunities to expand the grain crop production throughout the world as an addition to the grazing resources that people depend upon. By using No Kill in areas that are already grasslands or are arid or highly erodible, grain can be produced without risking ecological damage. Other advantages include the low capital costs involved and also low needs for outside energy intensive inputs.

No Kill Cropping is mentioned in the book "Here on Earth" by Tim Flannery, 2010. It is described as 'Zero Kill' or 'Zero Till' on pages 264 and 268. Flannery confuses the method by including the use of ploughs and also of the term pastures rather than grasslands that the crop is sown into. He proposes that the system has possibilities to promote "coevolution's capacity to increase biological productivity and ecosystem stability".
