= Minimum tillage =

Agricultural technique that conserves soil

Minimum tillage is a soil conservation system like strip-till with the goal of minimum soil manipulation necessary for a successful crop production. It is a tillage method that does not turn the soil over, in contrast to intensive tillage, which changes the soil structure using ploughs. In minimum tillage, primary tillage is completely avoided and only secondary tillage is practiced to a small extent. Minimum tillage includes practices like minimum furrowing, use of organic fertilizer, use of biological methods to control pests, and minimum use of chemicals.

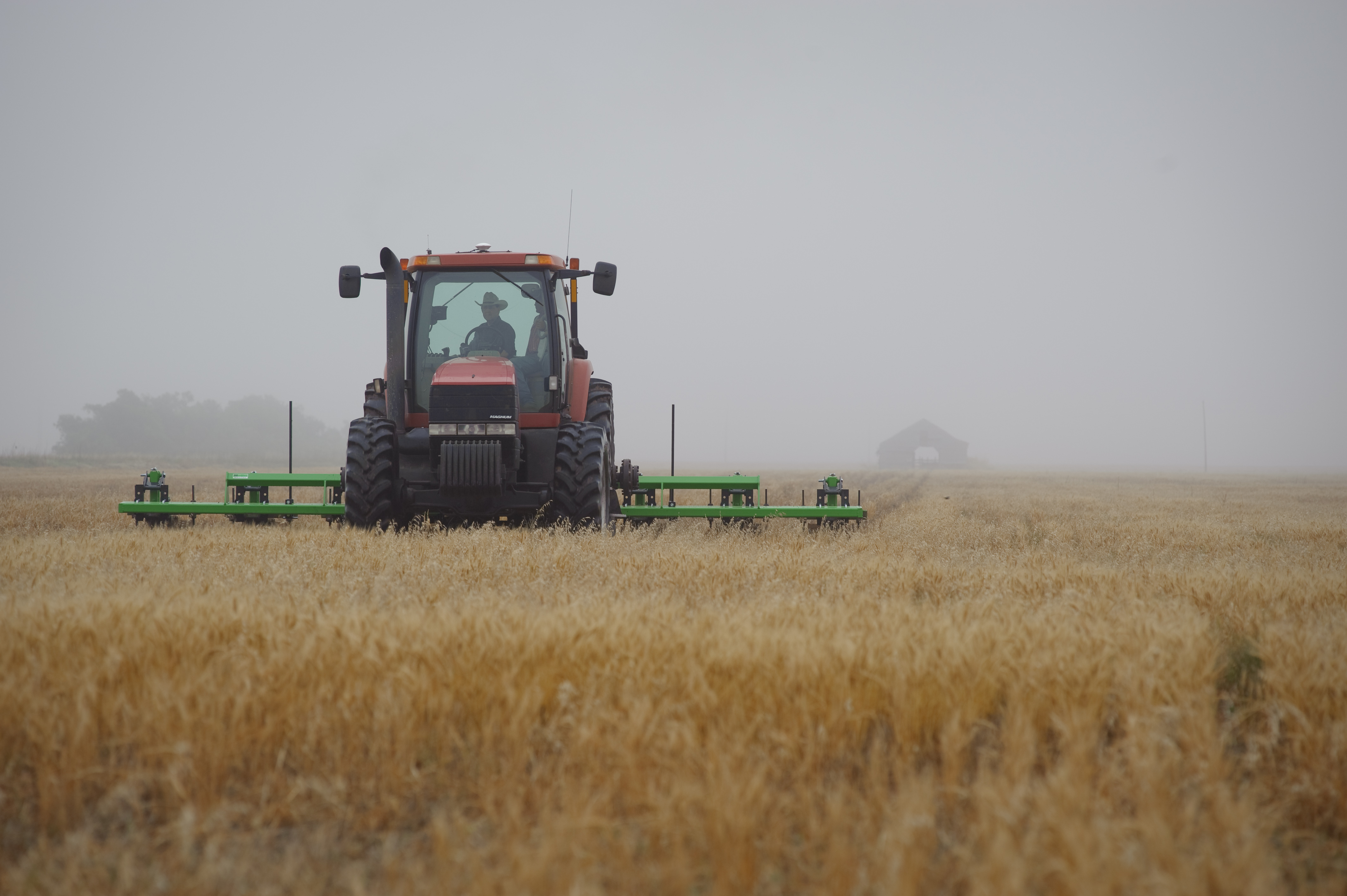
An example of minimum tillage in the modern age, shown through strip-tilling in an image from 2009.

== See also ==
- Conservation tillage
- Reduced tillage
- No-till farming
- Strip-till
