= Farmer's Voice =

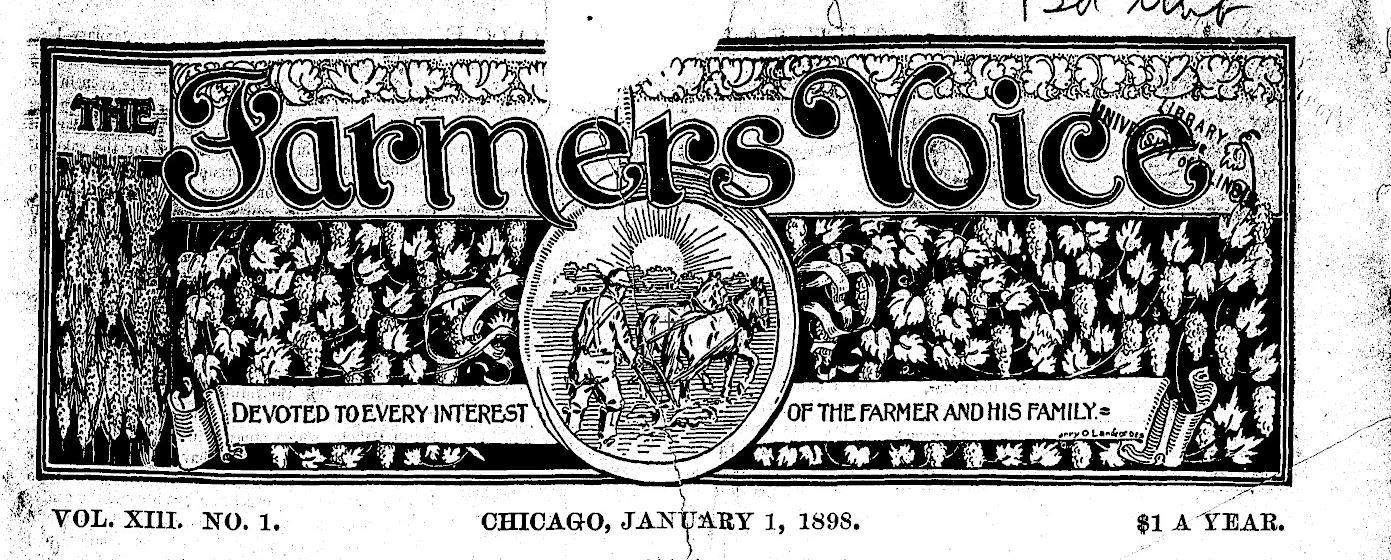
- The Farmers Voice masthead (January 1, 1898)
- Type: Weekly newspaper
- Format: Broadsheet
- Founded: 1885
- Headquarters: Chicago, Illinois

The Farmers Voice was a weekly or bi-weekly American agriculture-focused newspaper published beginning in 1885. It was published out of Chicago, Illinois. The Farmers Voice focused on different topics about farming, homemaking, and children's interests.
