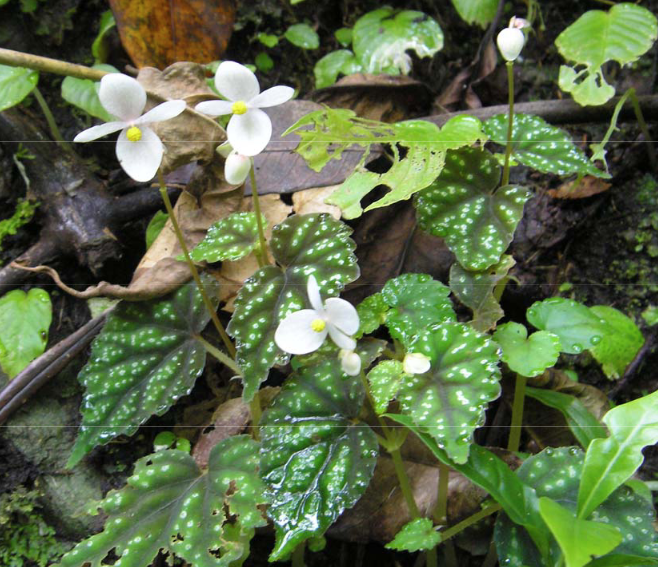

Scientific classification
- Kingdom: Plantae
- Clade: Tracheophytes
- Clade: Angiosperms
- Clade: Eudicots
- Clade: Rosids
- Order: Cucurbitales
- Family: Begoniaceae
- Genus: Begonia
- Species: B. tenuifolia

Binomial name
- Begonia tenuifolia Dryand.

Synonyms
- List: Begonia erosa Blume; Begonia lineata N.E.Br.; Begonia rupicola Miq.; Begonia varians A.DC.; Casparya erosa (Blume) A.DC.; Diploclinium tenuifolium (Dryand.) Miq.; Platycentrum erosum (Blume) Miq.; Platycentrum rupicola (Miq.) Miq.; Platycentrum tenuifolium (Dryand.) Miq.; Sphenanthera erosa (Blume) Hassk. ex Klotzsch

= Begonia tenuifolia =

Species of plant

Begonia tenuifolia is a species of flowering plant in the family Begoniaceae, native to Sumatra, Java, and the Lesser Sunda Islands. A tuberous geophyte of the seasonally dry tropics, it has variable leaf patterning and coloration. The leaves of young plants are round, with mature plants having narrow, ovate leaves. Individuals can reach 25 cm (10 in), but some have been observed to flower when only 2 cm (0.8 in) tall. The seeds are dispersed by a splash cup structure.

B. tenuifolia is one of the oldest documented Begonia species, having first been brought from Java by Sir Joseph Banks, described by Daniel Solander, and published in 1791 in Jonas Dryanders "Observations of the Genus Begonia."
