= Strip-till =

Soil conservation technique

Strip-till is a conservation system that uses a minimum tillage. It combines the soil drying and warming benefits of conventional tillage with the soil-protecting advantages of no-till by disturbing only the portion of the soil that is to contain the seed row. This type of tillage is performed with special equipment and can require the farmer to make multiple trips, depending on the strip-till implement used, and field conditions. Each row that has been strip-tilled is usually about eight to ten inches wide.

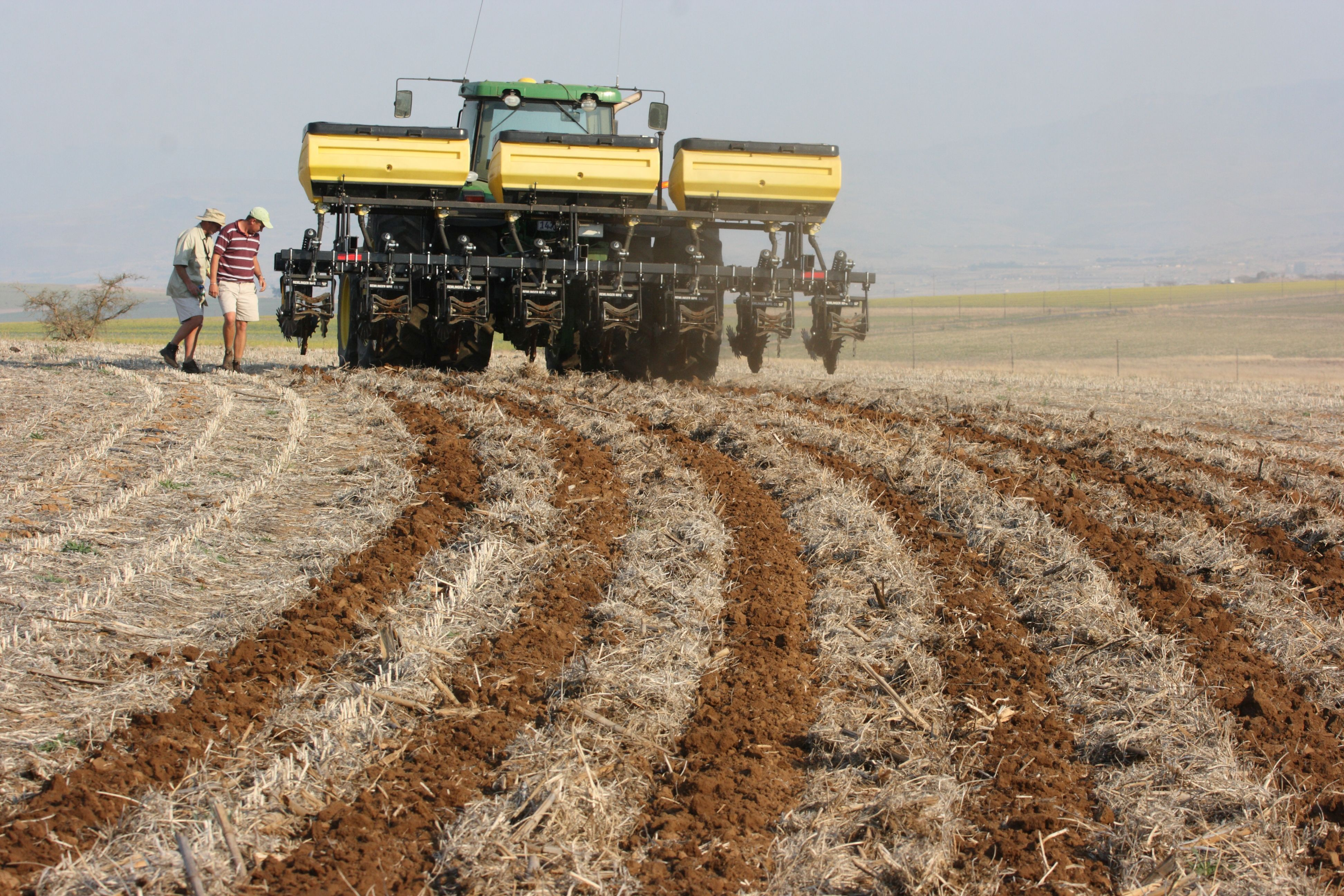
A strip-till demonstration

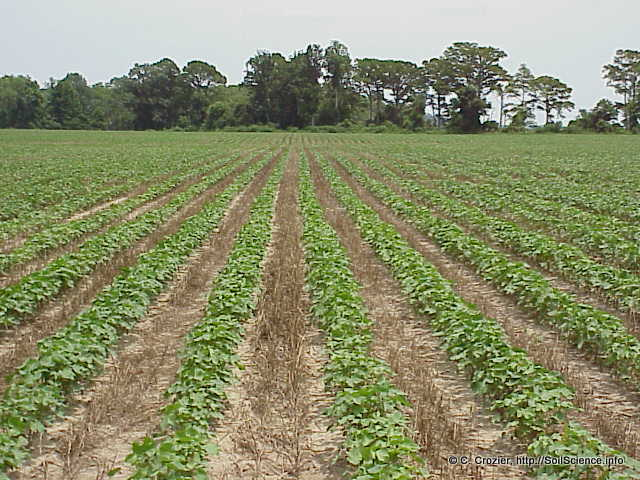
A field planted using strip-till. Notice the crop residue of prior crop between the growing crop rows.

== Differences in the equipment used ==
No-till planters have a disk opener and/or coulter that is located in front of the planting unit. This coulter is designed to cut through crop residue and into the hard crust of the soil. After the coulter has broken through the residue and crust, the disk opener of the planting unit slices the soil and the seed is dropped into the furrow that has been created and then a press wheel closes the furrow.

With strip-tillage systems more precision is needed. At the same time the field is strip-tilled, the fertilizer or chemical may be applied. If the meter of the chemical or fertilizer applicator is off slightly, an accurate rate may not be applied. This could result in increased expenses or reduction of the efficacy of the fertilizer or chemical program.

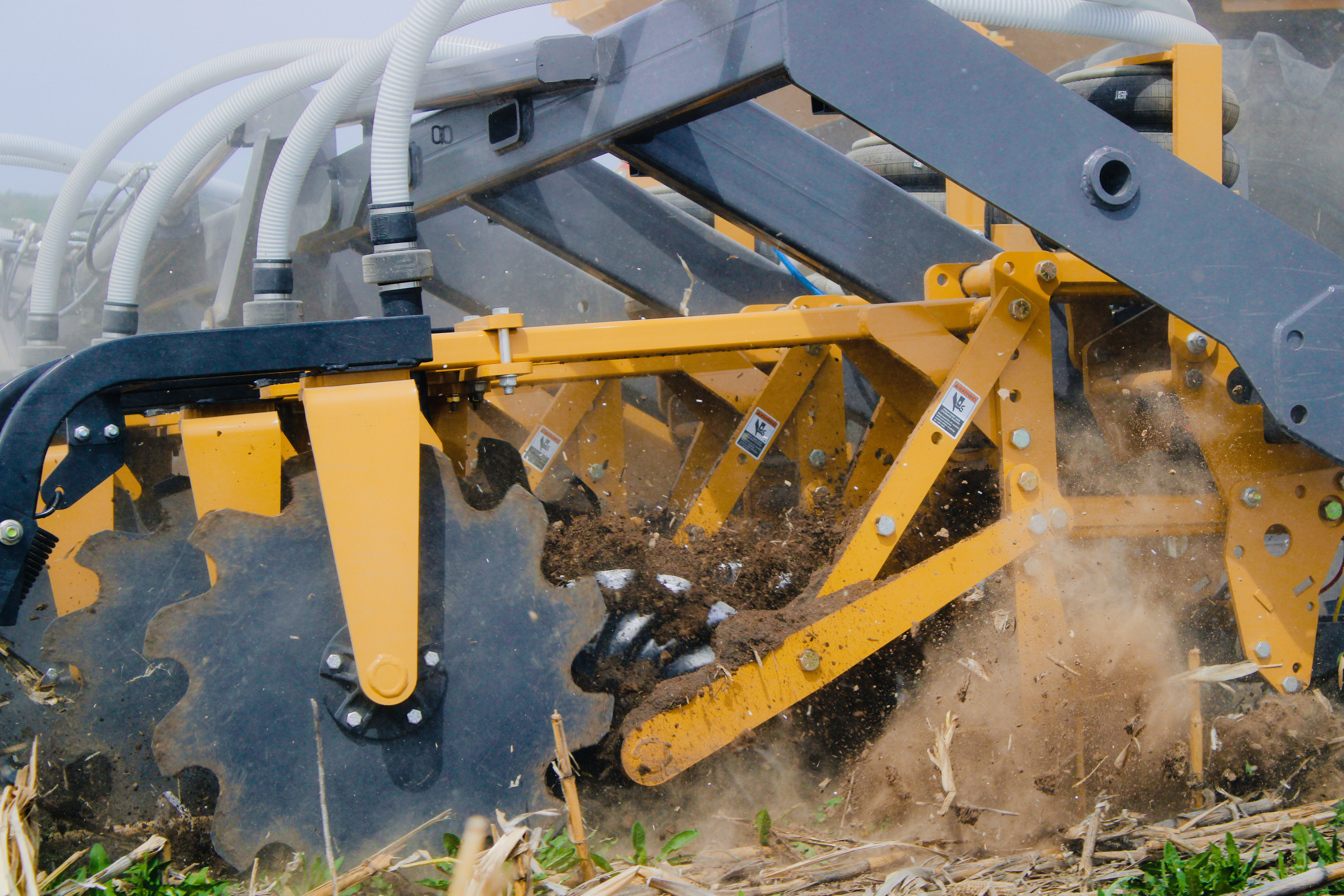
The SoilWarrior machine is used for strip-tillage. Instead of using a shank/knife, the machine uses a cog to till the soil into strips.

== Effects on the soils properties ==
Strip tillage has some similarities with no-till systems because the surface is protected with residue. However, strip-till also has a similar effect on soil properties as conventional tillage systems because the farmer still breaks the soil's crust which allows aerobic conditions to speed the decay of organic matter. A two-year study found that strip-till did not affect the amount of soil organic carbon or its extractable phosphorus.

When oxygen is introduced into the soil via tillage, the decomposition of organic matter is accelerated. Carbon, nitrogen, and phosphorus were all near the surface in the no-till system and providing poorer root access to nutrients than on reduced till, and conventional till systems in an Australian study.

== Impacts on productivity ==
In one study, yields were higher in the strip-tilled area than in the area where no-till was practiced. In a low phosphorus site, yield was 43.5 bushels/acre (2,925.5 kg/hectare) in strip-till compared to 41.5 bu/a (2,791 kg/ha) in a no-till system. Yield is comparable to that of intensive tillage systems — without the cost.

== Benefits of Strip till ==
Strip till warms the soil, it allows an aerobic condition, and it allows for a better seedbed than no-till. Strip-till allows the soil's nutrients to be better adapted to the plant's needs, while still giving residue cover to the soil between the rows. The system will still allow for some soil water contact that could cause erosion, however, the amount of erosion on a strip-tilled field would be light compared to the amount of erosion on an intensively tilled field. Furthermore, when liquid fertilizer is being applied, it can be directly applied in these rows where the seed is being planted, reducing the amount of fertilizer needed while improving proximity of the fertilizer to the roots. Compared to intensive tillage, strip tillage saves considerable time and money. Strip tillage can reduce the amount of trips through a field down to two or possibly one trip when using a strip till implement combined with other machinery such as a planter, fertilizer spreader, and chemical sprayer. This can save the farmer a considerable amount of time and fuel, while reducing soil compaction due to few passes in a field. With the use of GPS-guided tractors, this precision farming can increase overall yields. Strip-till conserves more soil moisture compared to intensive tillage systems. However, compared to no-till, strip-till may in some cases reduce soil moisture.

== Challenges of both Strip-till and No-till systems ==
In reduced tillage strategies, weed suppression can be difficult. In place of cultivation, a farmer can suppress weeds by managing a cover crop, mowing, crimping, or herbicide application. The purchase of mowing and crimping implements may represent an unjustifiable expenditure. Additionally, finding an appropriate cover crop mix for adequate weed suppression may be difficult. Also, without mowing or crimping implements it may not be possible to achieve a kill on the cover crop. If mowing, crimping, and suppression with a cover crop mixture fail, herbicides can be applied. However, this may represent an increase in total farm expenses due to herbicides being used in place of cultivation for weed suppression.

There are some disadvantages specific to strip-till systems. Some farmers may not be able to strip-till if there is an early freeze. Though strip tillage can be successful without a global position system (GPS) based guidance, it can be beneficial. Lastly, strip-till systems requires a high-horsepower tractor; however, the energy requirement is less than with conventional tillage systems.

== See also ==
- Conservation tillage
- Conservation Agriculture
- No-till farming
- Tillage erosion
