= Optimum water content for tillage =

The optimum water content for tillage (OPT) is defined as the moisture content of soil at which tillage produces the largest number of small aggregates.

== Overview ==
The Optimum Water Content of soil is the water content at which a maximum dry unit weight can be achieved after a given compaction effort. A max dry unit weight would have no voids in the soil. If you were trying to compact a hard dry soil to make it more dense, you might want to get it wet. The OPT is the water content of the soil in which you could compact it the most. If there is too much water you would have too much pore water pressure during compression to compact any further. If there is too little water the soil would naturally resist compaction via shear strength/friction/effective stress. The determination of the OPT is important because if tillage is carried out on fields that are wetter or drier than the OPT many problems can be caused, including soil structural damage, through the production of large clods, and an increase in the content of readily dispersible clay which is indicative of the soil stability.

The OPT can be determined in relation to the volumetric water content at the lower Plastic Limit of the soil (PL).

Some examples of suggested OPT:

- On a lateritic sandy loam : 0.77 PL
- On a sandy loam : 0.9 PL

For several soils the OPT has been found to equal 0.9 PL, although there are a number of limitations with the use of the lower plastic limit in determining the optimal moisture content. Firstly it is a property of a moulded soil and not an undisturbed soil in the field and secondly, many sandy soils are not plastic and do not have a lower plastic limit.

== Relationships between water content at field capacity (FC) and Plastic Limit(PL) ==
- When FC < PL

Soil will drain to a water content at which no excessive structural damage will occur on tillage.

- When FC > PL

Soil will never drain to a water content ideal for tillage

Many clay soils drain very slowly, and as a result they are usually wetter than PL unless they are dried by water extraction by plant uptake.

== Soil friability ==
Soil friability is the tendency of a mass of soil to crumble under the action of an applied force. This has been found to be maximum at the PL of a soil.

== See also ==
- Field capacity
- Plastic limit
