= Sowing =

Planting of seeds or other propagules in the ground for germination

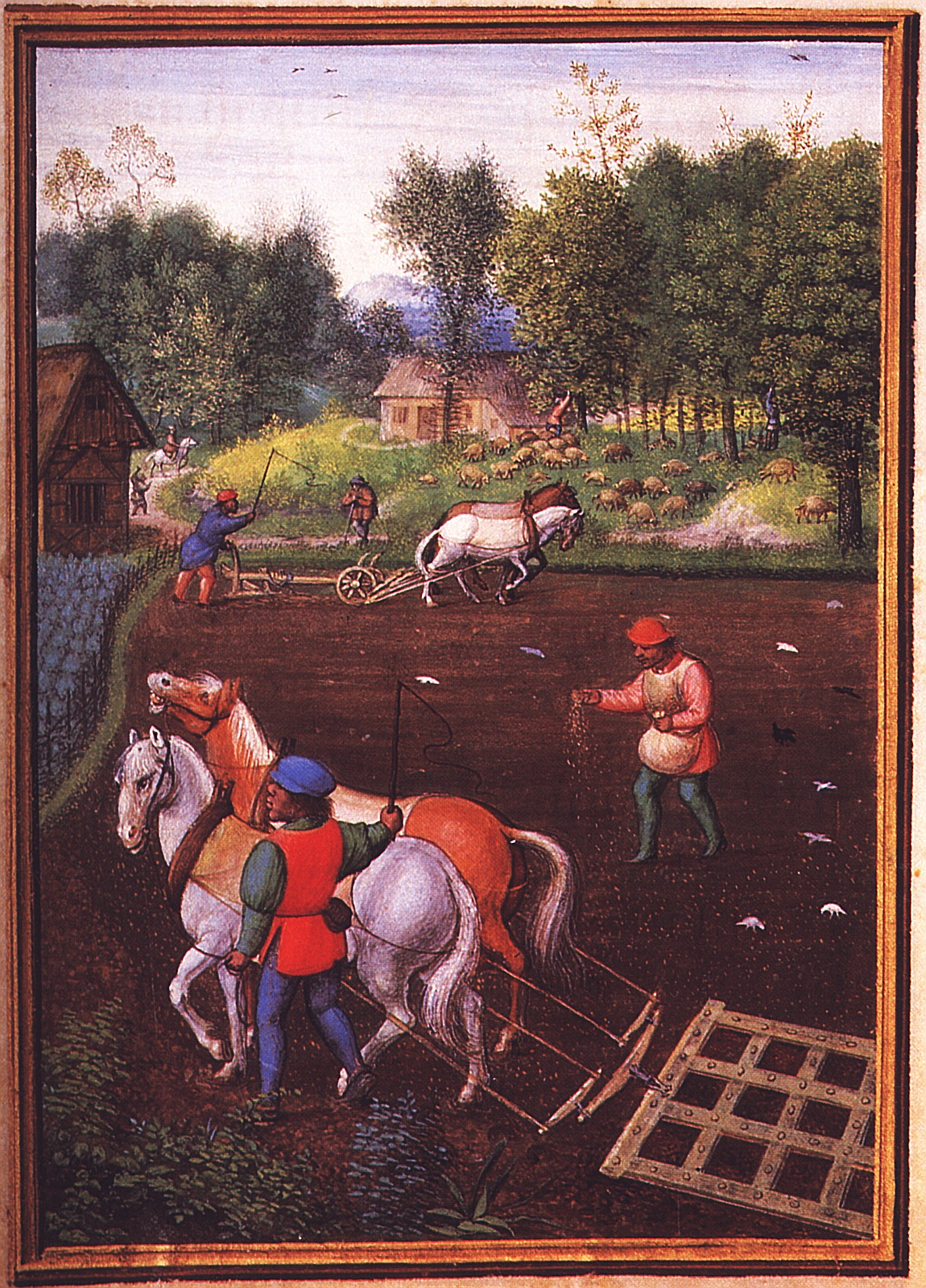
Simon Bening, Labors of the Months: September, from a Flemish Book of hours (Bruges)

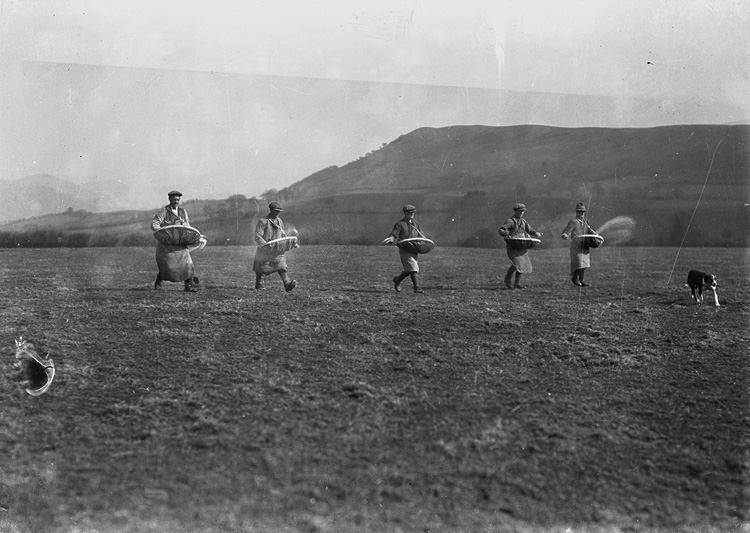
Men sowing seed by hand in the 1940s

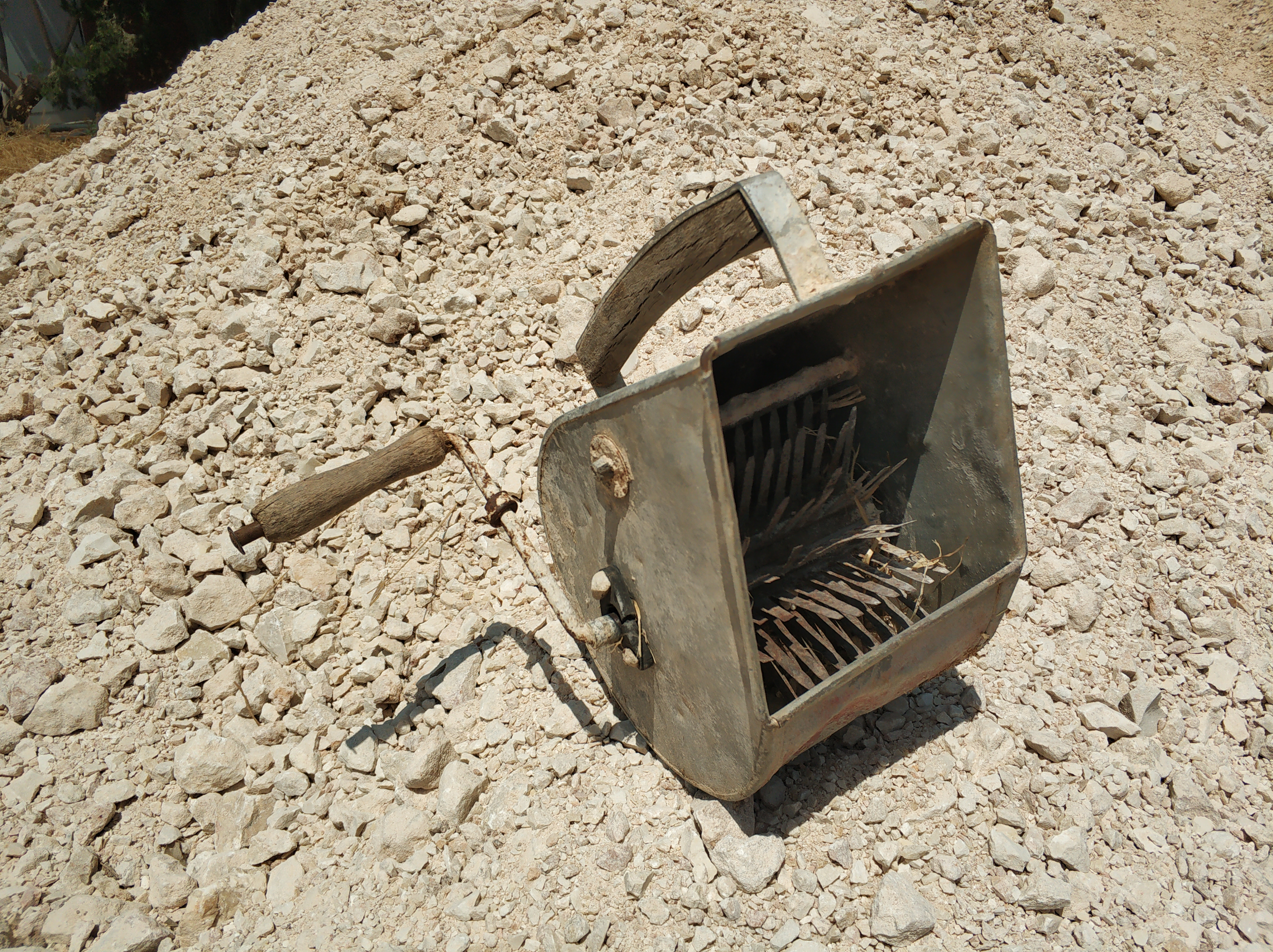
Manual sowing machine

Sowing is the process of planting seeds. An area that has had seeds planted in it will be described as a sowed or sown area.

== Plants which are usually sown ==
Among the major field crops, oats, wheat, and rye are sown, grasses and legumes are seeded and maize and soybeans are planted. In planting, wider rows (generally 75 cm (30 in) or more) are used, and the intent is to have precise; even spacing between individual seeds in the row, various mechanisms have been devised to count out individual seeds at exact intervals.

=== Depth of sowing ===
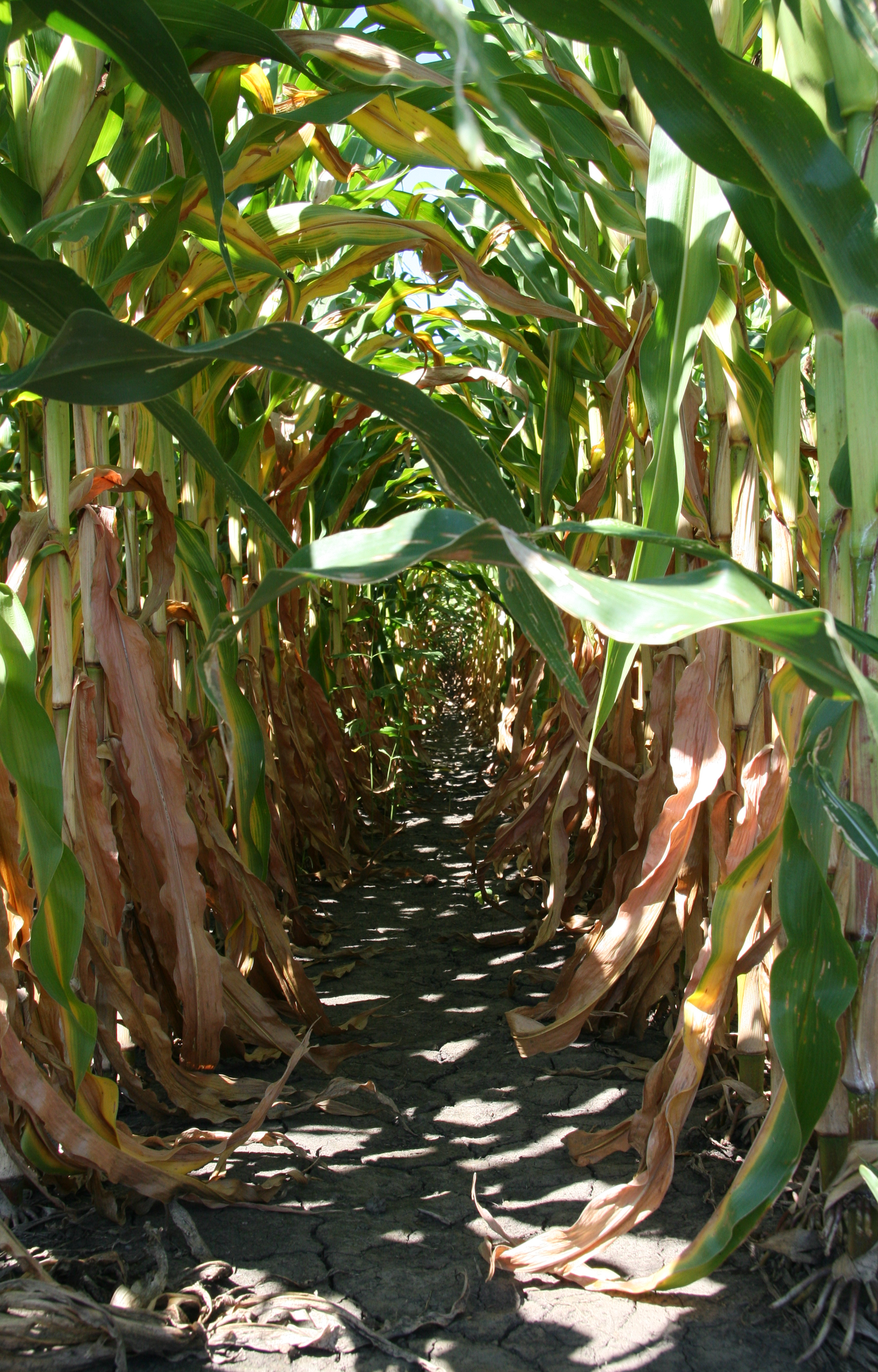
Regular rows of corn in a field in Indiana

In sowing, little if any soil is placed over the seeds, as seeds can be generally sown into the soil by maintaining a planting depth of about 2-3 times the size of the seed.

=== Sowing types and patterns ===
For hand sowing, several sowing types exist; these include:

- Flat sowing
- Ridge sowing
- Wide bed sowing

Several patterns for sowing may be used together with these types; these include:

- Rows that are indented at the even rows (so that the seeds are placed in a crossed pattern). This method is much better, as more light may fall on the seedlings as they come out.
- Symmetrical grid pattern – using the quincunx pattern described in The Garden of Cyrus

== Types of sowing ==
=== Hand sowing ===
Hand sowing or (planting) is the process of casting handfuls of seed over prepared ground: broadcasting, that is, broadcast seeding (from which the technological term is derived). Usually, a drag or harrow is employed to incorporate the seed into the soil. Though labor-intensive for any but small areas, this method is still used in some situations. Practice is required to sow evenly and at the desired rate. A hand seeder can be used for sowing, though it is less of a help than it is for the smaller seeds of grasses and legumes.

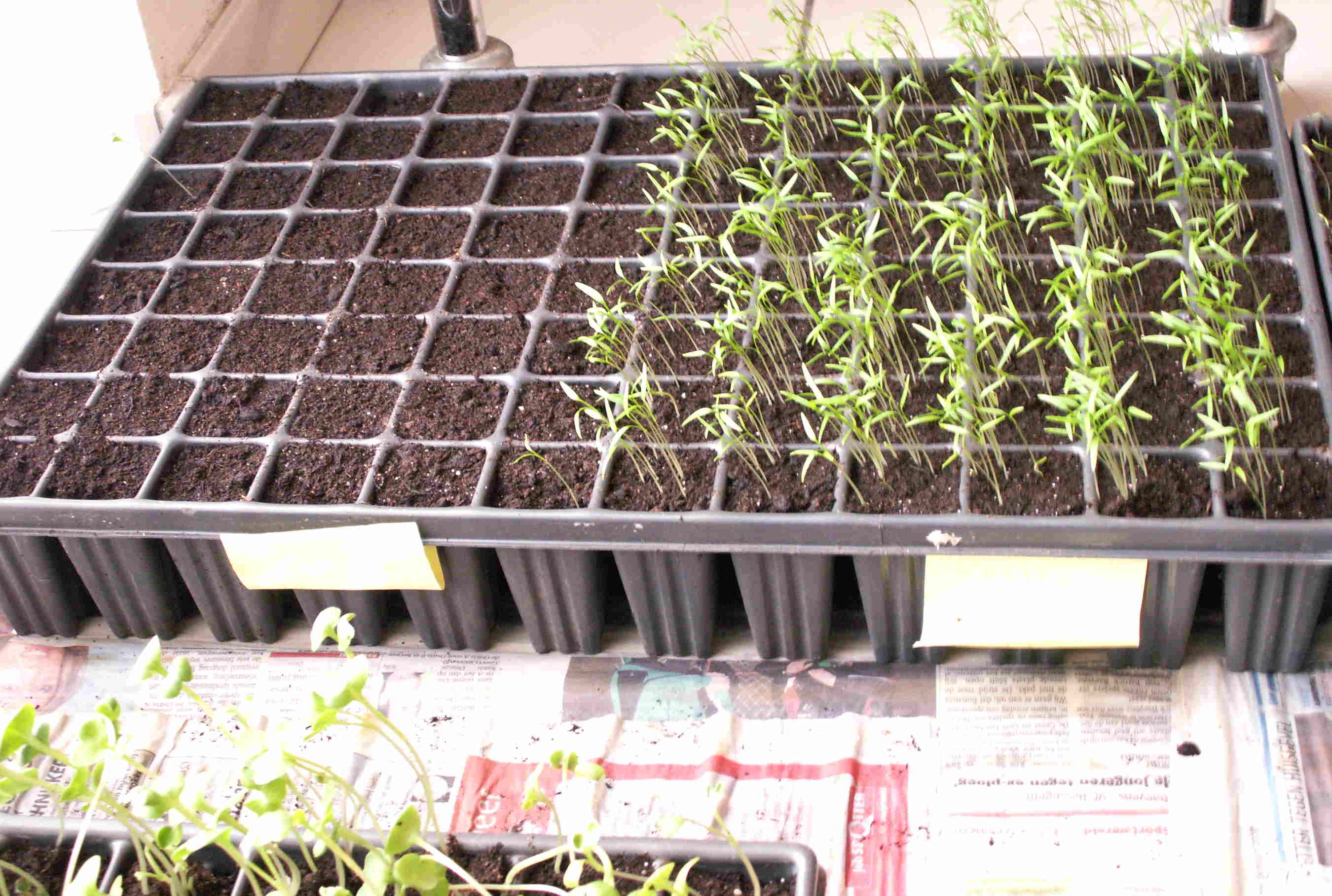
A tray used in horticulture (for sowing and taking plant cuttings)

Hand sowing may be combined with pre-sowing in seed trays. This allows the plants to come to strength indoors during cold periods (e.g. spring in temperate countries).

=== Seed drill ===
In agriculture, most seed is now sown using a seed drill, which offers the best precision; seed is sown evenly and at the desired rate. The drill also places the seed at a measured distance below the soil, so that less seed is required. The standard design uses a fluted feed metering system, which is volumetric in nature; individual seeds are not counted. Rows are typically about 10–30 cm apart, depending on the crop species and growing conditions. Several row opener types are used depending on soil type and local tradition. Grain drills are most often drawn by tractors, but can also be pulled by horses. Pickup trucks are sometimes used, since little draft is required.

A seed rate of about 100 kg of seed per hectare (2 bushels per acre) is typical, though rates vary considerably depending on crop species, soil conditions, and farmer's preference. Excessive rates can cause the crop to lodge, while too thin a rate will result in poor utilisation of the land, competition with weeds and a reduction in the yield.

=== Open field ===
Open-field planting refers to the form of sowing used historically in the agricultural context whereby fields are prepared generically and left open, as the name suggests, before being sown directly with seed. The seed is frequently left uncovered at the surface of the soil before germinating and therefore exposed to the prevailing climate and conditions like storms etc. This is in contrast to the seedbed method used more commonly in domestic gardening or more specific (modern) agricultural scenarios where the seed is applied beneath the soil surface and monitored and manually tended frequently to ensure more successful growth rates and better yields.

=== Pre-treatment of seed and soil before sowing ===
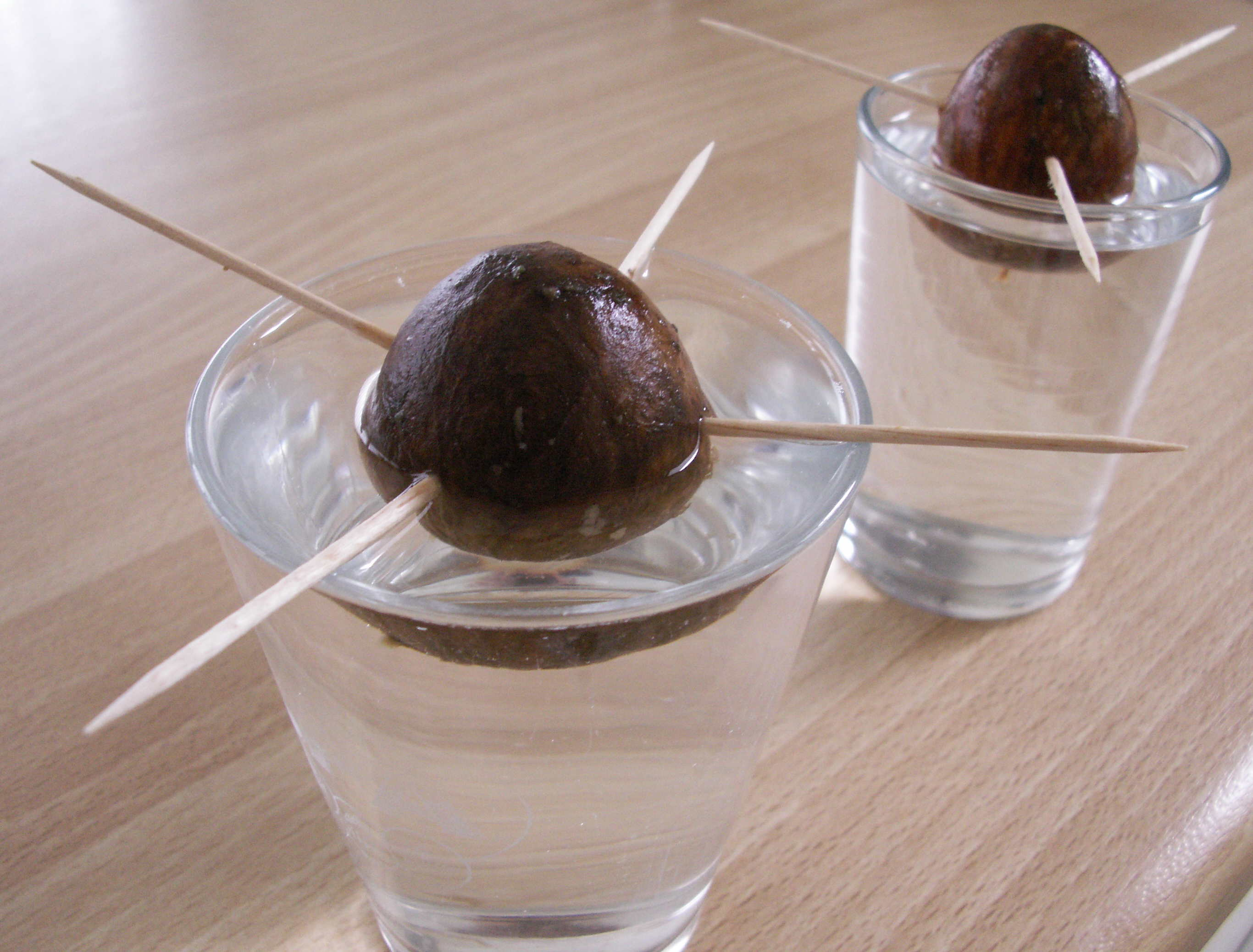
Tropical fruit such as avocado also benefit from special seed treatments (specifically invented for that particular tropical fruit)

Before sowing, certain seeds first require a treatment prior to the sowing process. This treatment may be seed scarification, stratification, seed soaking or seed cleaning with cold (or medium hot) water.

Seed soaking is generally done by placing seeds in medium hot water for at least 24 to up to 48 hours Seed cleaning is done especially with fruit, as the flesh of the fruit around the seed can quickly become prone to attack from insects or plagues. Seed washing is generally done by submerging cleansed seeds 20 minutes in 50 degree Celsius water. This (rather hot than moderately hot) water kills any organisms that may have survived on the skin of a seed. Especially with easily infected tropical fruit such as lychees and rambutans, seed washing with high-temperature water is vital.

In addition to the mentioned seed pretreatments, seed germination is also assisted when a disease-free soil is used. Especially when trying to germinate difficult seed (e.g. certain tropical fruit), prior treatment of the soil (along with the usage of the most suitable soil; e.g. potting soil, prepared soil or other substrates) is vital. The two most used soil treatments are pasteurisation and sterilisation. Depending on the necessity, pasteurisation is to be preferred as this does not kill all organisms. Sterilisation can be done when trying to grow truly difficult crops. To pasteurise the soil, the soil is heated for 15 minutes in an oven of 120 °C.

== See also ==
- Advance sowing
- Plant propagation
- Planter (farm implement)
- Priming (agriculture)
- Seed drill; a mechanical aid allowing much better and faster seed dispersal than when done by hand
- Tree planting
