= Crop residue =

Waste materials generated by agriculture

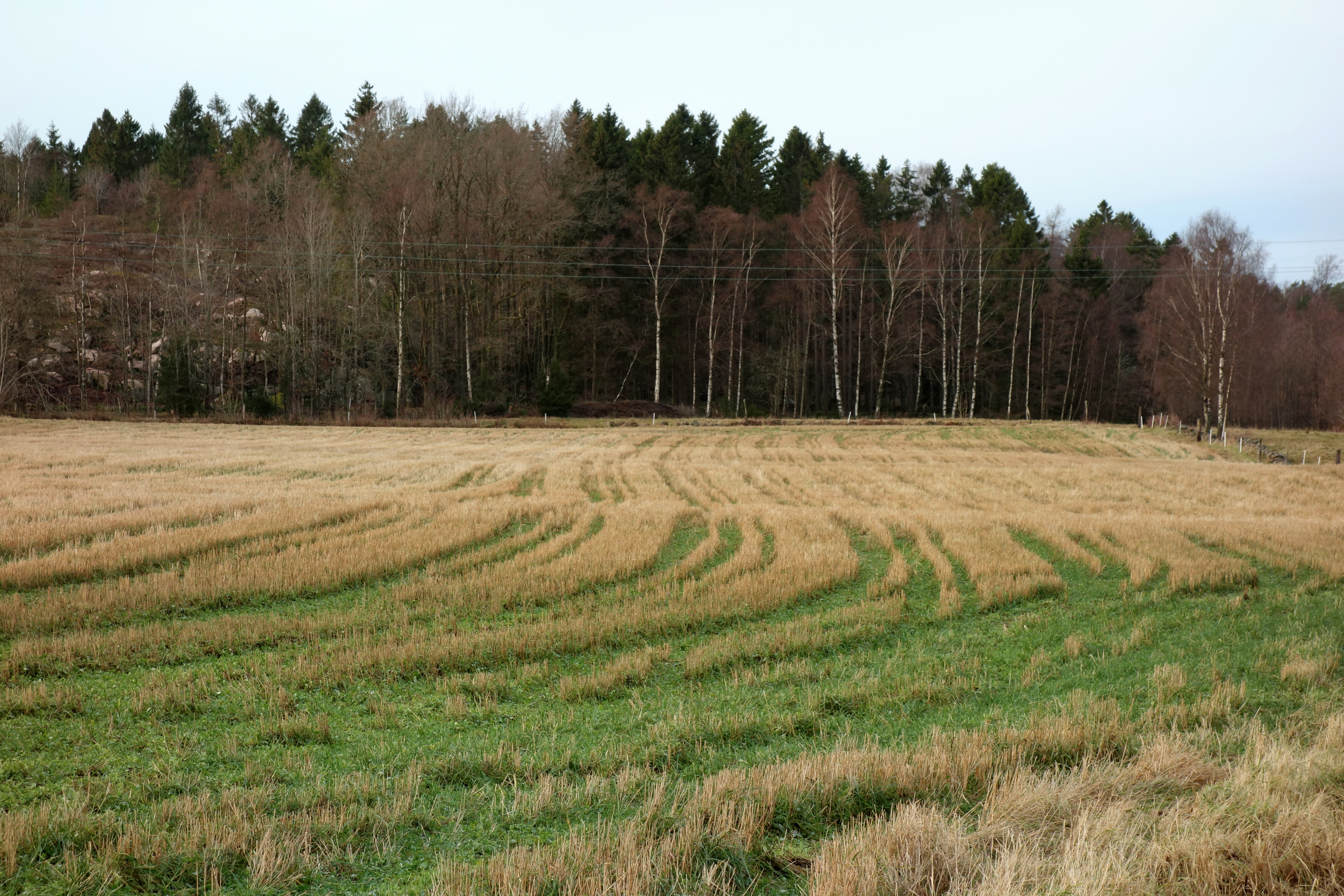
Stubble field in Brastad, Sweden

Crop residues are waste materials generated by agriculture. The two types are:

- Field residues are materials left in an agricultural field or orchard after the crop has been harvested. These residues include stalks and stubble (stems), leaves and seed pods. Good management of field residues can increase efficiency of irrigation and control of erosion. The residue can be ploughed directly into the ground, or burned first. In contrast, no-till, strip-till or reduced-till agriculture practices are carried out to maximize crop residue cover.
- Process residues are materials left after the crop is processed into a usable resource. These residues include husks, seeds, bagasse, molasses and roots. They can be used as animal fodder and soil amendment, fertilizers and in manufacturing.

== Measurements ==
The amount of crop residue can be estimated using photographic techniques or remote sensing. Simple line-transect measurements can also be used to estimate coverage.

== Economic value ==
Crop residues can be used effectively in many ways:

- Biofertilizer: Most discussions about the economic value of crop residues focus on the equivalent fertilizer cost of the nutrients within. Although crop residues contain both macronutrients and micronutrients, only macronutrients such as nitrogen, phosphorus, potassium and sulfur are economically significant.
- Use in agronomic practice as strawbed to produce crops (e.g. in strawberry cultivation). They are widely used in mushroom cultivation. The residues after mushroom cultivation can act as good substrate for composting and biofertilizer applications.
- Particle board: Recent developments suggest potential use of crop residues in the manufacture of particle board.

== Biofuel production from crop residues ==
Because of the high carbohydrate content, crop residues can be considered as an appropriate feedstock to produce biofuels. Some algorithms have been developed to estimate the potential capacity of biofuel production from agricultural residues. Based on the experimental data obtained from a study that used ethanol organosolv pretreated rice straw to produce biohydrogen using Enterobacter aerogenes, the annual global amount of collectable rice straw (not total produced straw) for biofuel production was estimated about 249 million tonnes, that could approximately produce 355.78 kilotonnes of hydrogen and 11.32 million tonnes of lignin by the proposed organosolv technology and it was found that China contributes to about 32% of global potential capacity to produce biohydrogen from rice straw.

== Mineralization ==
Nutrients in most crop residue are not immediately available for crop use. Their release (called mineralization) occurs over a period of years. The biological processes involved in soil nutrient cycles are complex. As a rough guide, cereal straw releases about 10 to 15 per cent of its nutrients and pea residues release about 35 percent of their nutrients by the next year.

The speed of mineralization depends on the nitrogen and lignin (fiber) content, soil moisture, temperature, and degree of mixing with the soil. N is released fairly quickly from residue when the content is higher than 1.5 per cent (such as in pea residues). In contrast, below 1.2 per cent (such as cereal residue), soil-available N is fixed (called immobilization) by the microbes as they decompose the residue.

Thus pea residue would have short- and long-term benefits to soil fertility, whereas cereal straw would reduce next year's soil supply of available nutrients. Over time, the nutrients fixed by soil microbes and humus are released and available to crops. Nutrients from residue are not fully recovered by crops. Just like fertilizer nutrients, nutrients released from crop residue into the soil are susceptible to losses such as leaching (N and S), denitrification (N), immobilization (N, P, K and S), and fixation (P and K).

== Efficiency of nutrient uptake ==
The efficiency of nutrient uptake by crops from fertilizers or residue release is generally thought to be similar. For example, about 50 percent recovery of N in the above-ground plant in the first year. There is some residual benefit of fertilizers as the crops take up a small amount of the nutrients two and three years later. Fertilizer placement can significantly affect the efficiency of crop uptake. The impact of residue placement (buried by tillage or left on the surface in zero tillage) on nutrient cycling and efficiency is under study.

Thus, the practice of calculating the fertilizer equivalent value of the nutrients in crop residue is a reasonable guide to estimating the partial value of crop residues.

== See also ==
- Conventional tillage
