= Conventional tillage =

Conventional tillage refers to tillage operations considered standard for a specific location and crop and that tend to bury the crop residues; usually considered as a base for determining the cost effectiveness of erosion control practices.

== See also ==
- Conservation tillage
