= Weed control =

Botanical component of pest control for plants

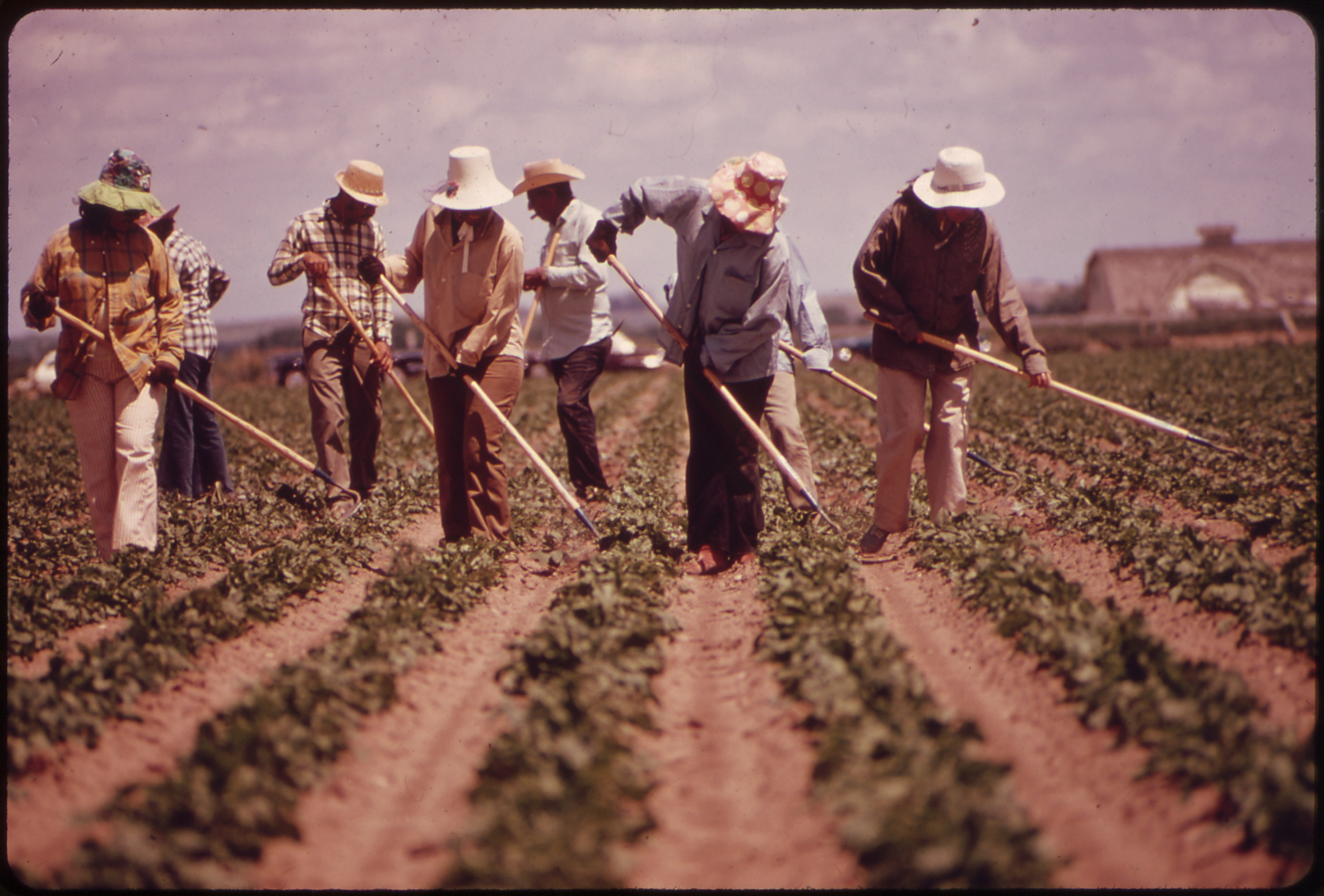
A field of beets being weeded in Colorado, United States, in 1972

Weed control is a type of pest control, which attempts to stop or reduce growth of weeds, especially noxious weeds, with the aim of reducing their competition with desired flora and fauna including domesticated plants and livestock, and in natural settings preventing non native species competing with native species.

Weed control is important in agriculture. Methods include hand cultivation with hoes, powered cultivation with cultivators, smothering with mulch, lethal wilting with high heat, burning, and chemical control with herbicides (weed killers).

== Need for control ==
Weeds compete with productive crops or pasture. They can be poisonous, distasteful, produce burrs, thorns, or otherwise interfere with the use and management of desirable plants by contaminating harvests or interfering with livestock.

Weeds compete with crops for space, nutrients, water and light. Smaller, slower growing seedlings are more susceptible than those that are larger and more vigorous. Onions are one of the most vulnerable, because they are slow to germinate and produce slender, upright stems. By contrast broad beans produce large seedlings and suffer far fewer effects other than during periods of water shortage at the crucial time when the pods are filling out. Transplanted crops raised in sterile soil or potting compost gain a head start over germinating weeds.

Weeds also vary in their competitive abilities according to conditions and season. Tall-growing vigorous weeds such as fat hen (Chenopodium album) can have the most pronounced effects on adjacent crops, although seedlings of fat hen that appear in late summer produce only small plants. Chickweed (Stellaria media), a low growing plant, can happily co-exist with a tall crop during the summer, but plants that have overwintered will grow rapidly in early spring and may swamp crops such as onions or spring greens.

The presence of weeds does not necessarily mean that they are damaging a crop, especially during the early growth stages when both weeds and crops can grow without interference. However, as growth proceeds they each begin to require greater amounts of water and nutrients. Estimates suggest that weed and crop can co-exist harmoniously for around three weeks before competition becomes significant. One study found that after competition had started, the final yield of onion bulbs was reduced at almost 4% per day.

Perennial weeds with bulbils, such as lesser celandine and oxalis, or with persistent underground stems such as couch grass (Agropyron repens) or creeping buttercup (Ranunculus repens) store reserves of food, and are thus able to persist in drought or through winter. Some perennials such as couch grass exude allelopathic chemicals that inhibit the growth of other nearby plants.

Weeds can also host pests and diseases that can spread to cultivated crops. Charlock and Shepherd's purse may carry clubroot, eelworm can be harboured by chickweed, fat hen and shepherd's purse, while the cucumber mosaic virus, which can devastate the cucurbit family, is carried by a range of different weeds including chickweed and groundsel.

Pests such as cutworms may first attack weeds but then move on to cultivated crops.

Some plants are considered weeds by some farmers and crops by others. Charlock, a common weed in the southeastern United States, are weeds according to row crop growers, but are valued by beekeepers, who seek out places where it blooms all winter, thus providing pollen for honeybees and other pollinators. Its bloom resists all but a very hard freeze, and recovers once the freeze ends.

== Weed propagation ==
=== Seeds ===
Annual and biennial weeds such as chickweed, annual meadow grass, shepherd's purse, groundsel, fat hen, cleaver, speedwell and hairy bittercress propagate themselves by seeding. Many produce huge numbers of seed several times a season, some all year round. Groundsel can produce 1000 seed, and can continue right through a mild winter, whilst Scentless Mayweed produces over 30,000 seeds per plant. Not all of these will germinate at once, but over several seasons, lying dormant in the soil sometimes for years until exposed to light. Poppy seed can survive 80–100 years, dock 50 or more. There can be many thousands of seeds in a square foot or square metre of ground, thus any soil disturbance will produce a flush of fresh weed seedlings.

=== Subsurface/surface ===
The most persistent perennials spread by underground creeping rhizomes that can regrow from a tiny fragment. These include couch grass, bindweed, ground elder, nettles, rosebay willow herb, Japanese knotweed, horsetail and bracken, as well as creeping thistle, whose tap roots can put out lateral roots. Other perennials put out runners that spread along the soil surface. As they creep they set down roots, enabling them to colonise bare ground with great rapidity. These include creeping buttercup and ground ivy. Yet another group of perennials propagate by stolons- stems that arch back into the ground to reroot. The most familiar of these is the bramble.

== Methods ==
Weed control plans typically consist of many methods which are divided into biological, chemical, cultural, and physical/mechanical control.

=== Physical/mechanical methods ===
==== Coverings ====
In a domestic gardens, methods of weed control include covering an area of ground with a material that creates an unsuitable environment for weed growth, known as a weed mat. For example, several layers of wet newspaper prevent light from reaching plants beneath, which kills them.

In the case of black plastic, the greenhouse effect kills the plants. Although the black plastic sheet is effective at preventing weeds that it covers, it is difficult to achieve complete coverage. Eradicating persistent perennials may require the sheets to be left in place for at least two seasons.

Some plants are said to produce root exudates that suppress herbaceous weeds. Tagetes minuta is claimed to be effective against couch and ground elder, whilst a border of comfrey is also said to act as a barrier against the invasion of some weeds including couch. A 5–10 centimetres (2.0–3.9 in) layer of wood chip mulch prevents some weeds from sprouting.

Gravel can serve as an inorganic mulch.

Irrigation is sometimes used as a weed control measure such as in the case of paddy fields to kill any plant other than the water-tolerant rice crop.

==== Manual removal ====
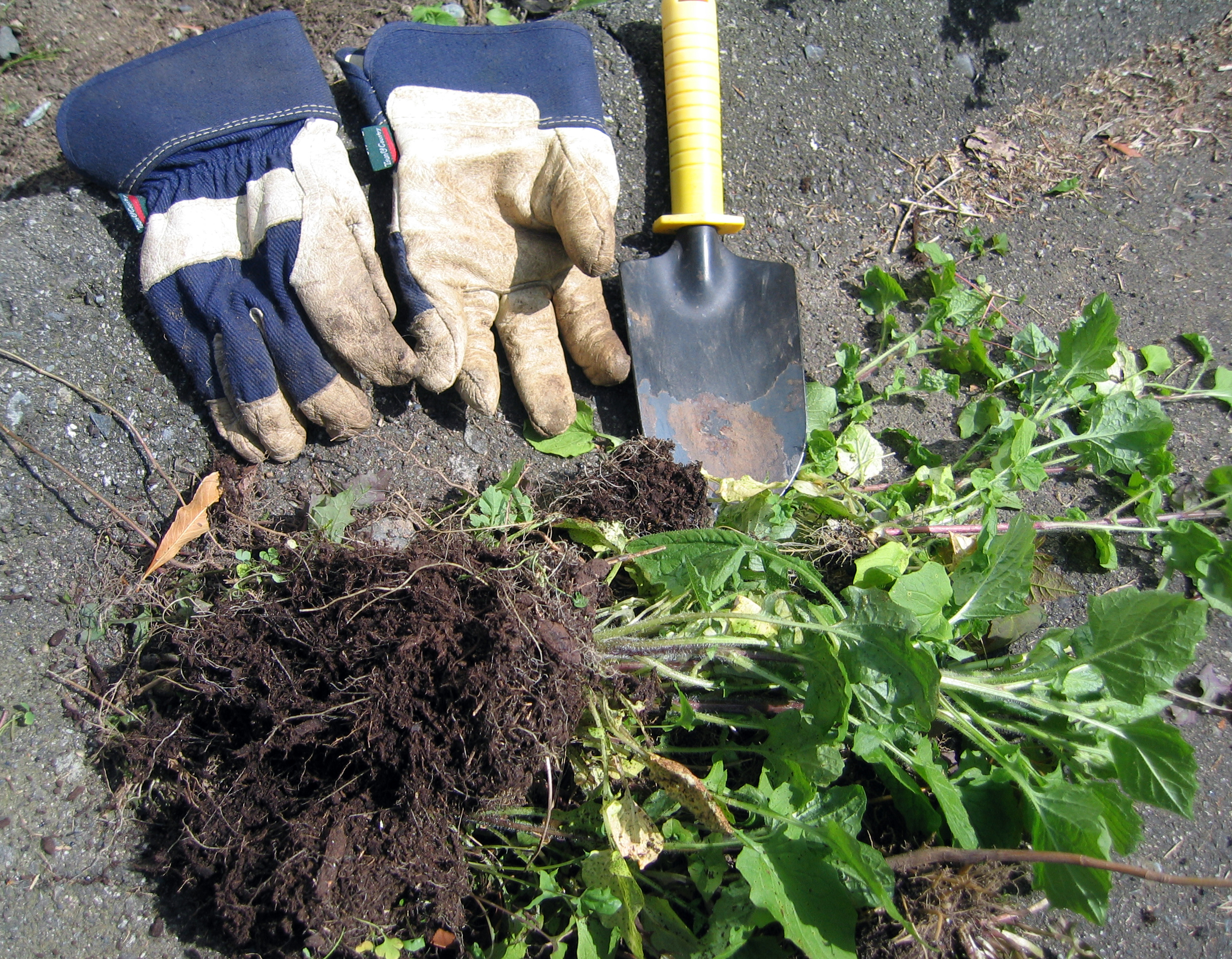
Tools used for amateur weeding include spades and gloves

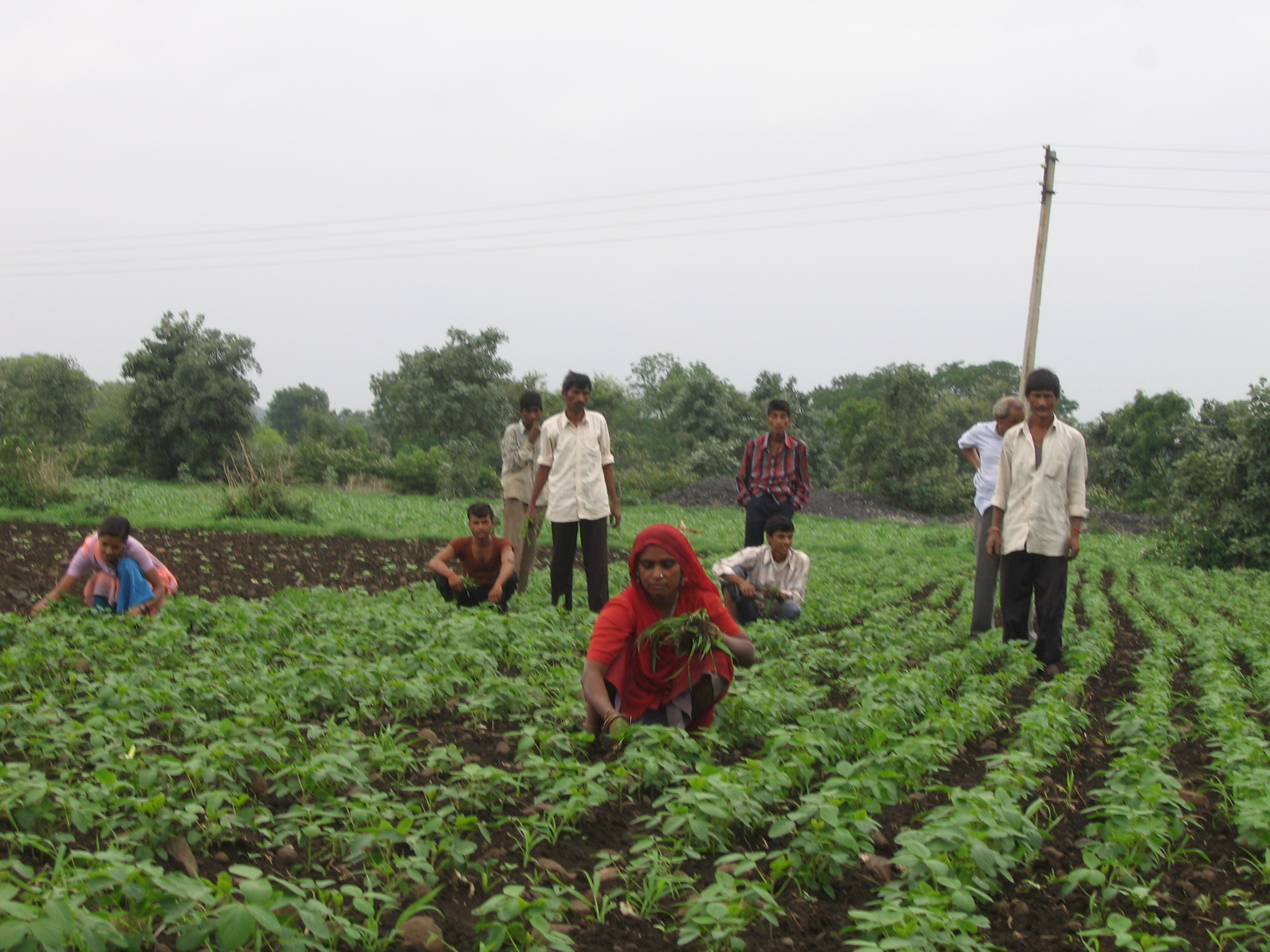
Weeds are removed manually in large parts of India.

Gardeners can remove weeds by manually pulling them out of the ground, making sure to include the roots that would otherwise allow some to re-sprout.

Hoeing off weed leaves and stems as soon as they appear can eventually weaken and kill perennials, although this will require persistence in the case of plants such as bindweed. Nettle infestations can be tackled by cutting back at least three times a year, repeated over a three-year period. Bramble can be dealt with in a similar way.

A highly successful, mostly manual, removal programme of weed control in natural bush land has been the control of sea spurge by Sea Spurge Remote Area Teams in Tasmania.

==== Tillage ====
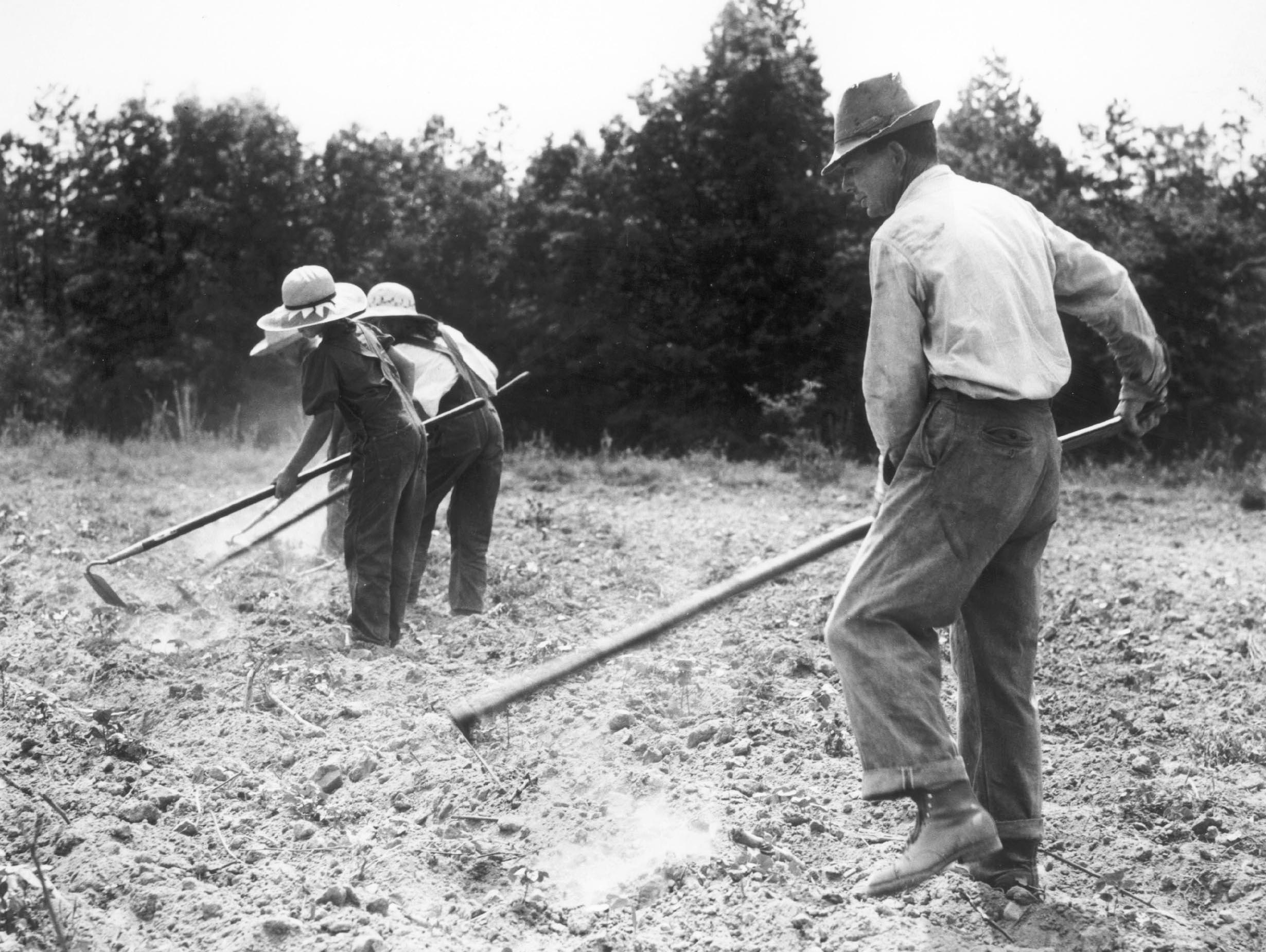
Weed control through tilling with hoes, circa 1930-40s

Ploughing includes tilling of soil, intercultural ploughing and summer ploughing. Ploughing uproots weeds, causing them to die. Summer ploughing also helps in killing pests.

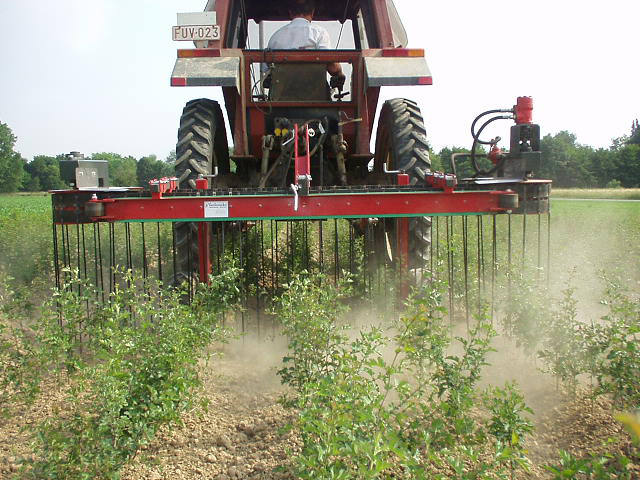
A mechanical weed control device

Mechanical tilling with various types of cultivators can remove weeds around crop plants at various points in the growing process.

An Aquamog, an aquatic weed harvester, can be used to remove weeds covering a body of water.

==== Thermal ====
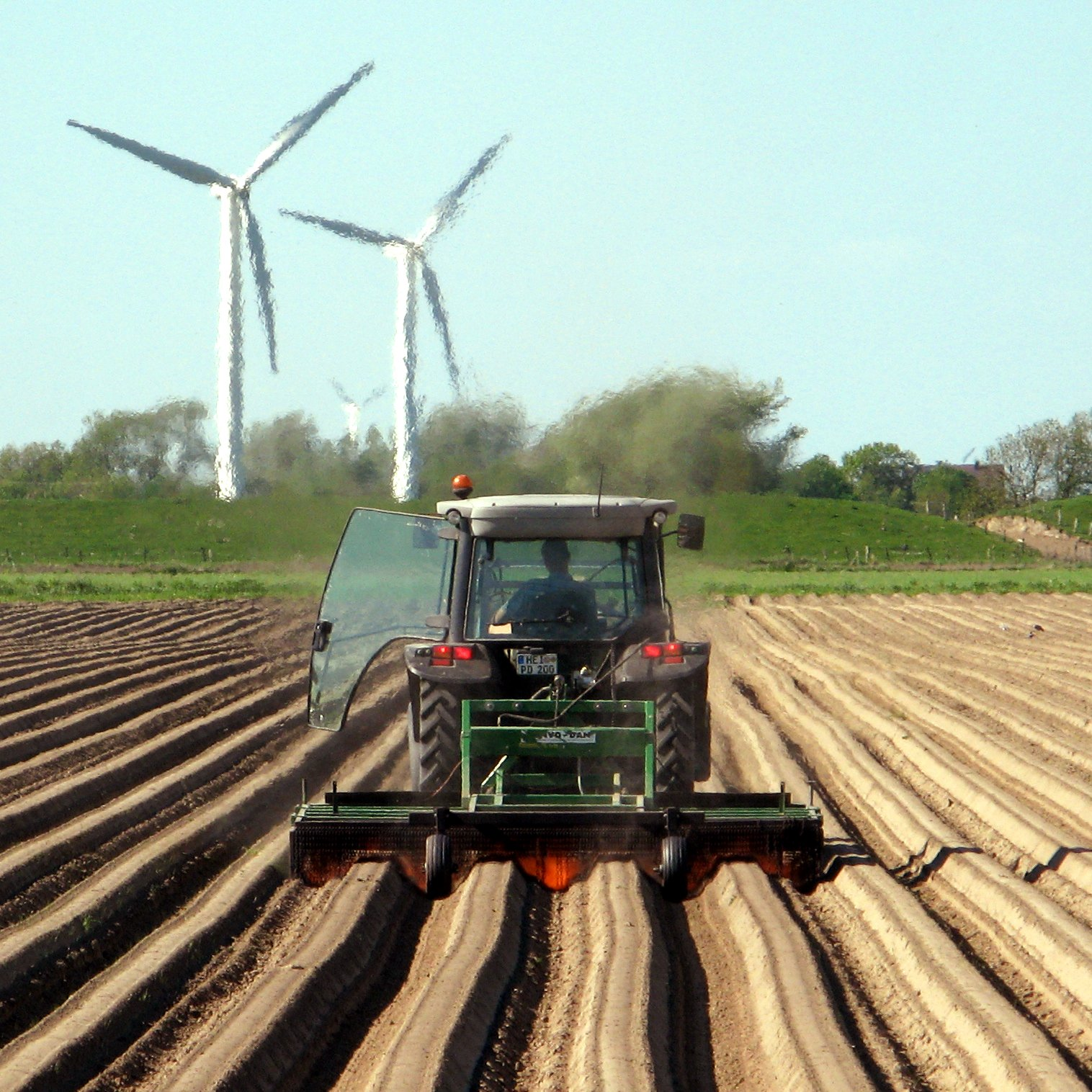
Pesticide-free thermic weed control with a weed burner on a potato field in Dithmarschen, Germany

Several thermal methods can control weeds.

Flame weeding uses a flame several centimetres/inches away from the weeds to singe them, giving them a sudden and severe heating. The goal of flame weeding is not necessarily burning the plant, but rather causing a lethal wilting by denaturing proteins in the weed. Similarly, hot air weeders can heat up the seeds to the point of destroying them. Flame weeders can be combined with techniques such as stale seedbeds (preparing and watering the seedbed early, then killing the nascent crop of weeds that springs up from it, then sowing the crop seeds) and pre-emergence flaming (doing a flame pass against weed seedlings after the sowing of the crop seeds but before those seedlings emerge from the soil—a span of time that can be days or weeks).

Hot foam causes the cell walls to rupture, killing the plant. Weed burners heat up soil quickly and destroy superficial parts of the plants. Weed seeds are often heat resistant and even react with an increase of growth on dry heat.

Since the 19th century soil steam sterilization has been used to clean weeds completely from soil. Several research results confirm the high effectiveness of humid heat against weeds and its seeds.

Soil solarization in some circumstances is very effective at eliminating weeds while maintaining grass. Planted grass tends to have a higher heat/humidity tolerance than unwanted weeds.

==== Lasers ====
In precision agriculture, novel agricultural robots and machines can use lasers for weed control, called "laserweeding". Their benefits may include "healthier crops and soil, decreased herbicide use, and reduced chemical and labor costs".

==== Seed targeting ====
In 1998, the Australian Herbicide Resistance Initiative debuted. gathered fifteen scientists and technical staff members to conduct field surveys, collect seeds, test for resistance and study the biochemical and genetic mechanisms of resistance. A collaboration with DuPont led to a mandatory herbicide labeling program, in which each mode of action is clearly identified by a letter of the alphabet.

The key innovation of the Australian Herbicide Resistance Initiative has been to focus on weed seeds. Ryegrass seeds last only a few years in soil, so if farmers can prevent new seeds from arriving, the number of sprouts will shrink each year. Until the new approach farmers were unintentionally helping the seeds. Their combines loosen ryegrass seeds from their stalks and spread them over the fields. In the mid-1980s, a few farmers hitched covered trailers, called "chaff carts", behind their combines to catch the chaff and weed seeds. The collected material is then burned.

An alternative is to concentrate the seeds into a half-meter-wide strip called a windrow and burn the windrows after the harvest, destroying the seeds. Since 2003, windrow burning has been adopted by about 70% of farmers in Western Australia.

Yet another approach is the Harrington Seed Destructor, which is an adaptation of a coal pulverizing cage mill that uses steel bars whirling at up to 1500 rpm. It keeps all the organic material in the field and does not involve combustion, but kills 95% of seeds.

=== Cultural methods ===
==== Stale seed bed ====
Another manual technique is the stale seed bed', which involves cultivating the soil, then leaving it fallow for a week or so. When the initial weeds sprout, the grower lightly hoes them away before planting the desired crop. However, even a freshly cleared bed is susceptible to airborne seed from elsewhere, as well as seed carried by passing animals on their fur, or from imported manure.

==== Buried drip irrigation ====
Buried drip irrigation involves burying drip tape in the subsurface near the planting bed, thereby limiting weeds access to water while also allowing crops to obtain moisture. It is most effective during dry periods.

==== Crop rotation ====
Rotating crops with ones that kill weeds by choking them out, such as hemp, Mucuna pruriens, and other crops, can be a very effective method of weed control. It is a way to avoid the use of herbicides, and to gain the benefits of crop rotation.

=== Biological methods ===
A biological weed control regiment can consist of biological control agents, bioherbicides, use of grazing animals, and protection of natural predators. Post-dispersal, weed seed predators, like ground beetles and small vertebrates, can substantially contribute to the weed regulation by removing weed seeds from the soil surface and thus reduce seed bank size. Several studies provided evidence for the role of invertebrates to the biological control of weeds

==== Animal grazing ====
Companies using goats to control and eradicate leafy spurge, knapweed, and other toxic weeds have sprouted across the American West.

=== Chemical methods ===
==== Herbicides ====
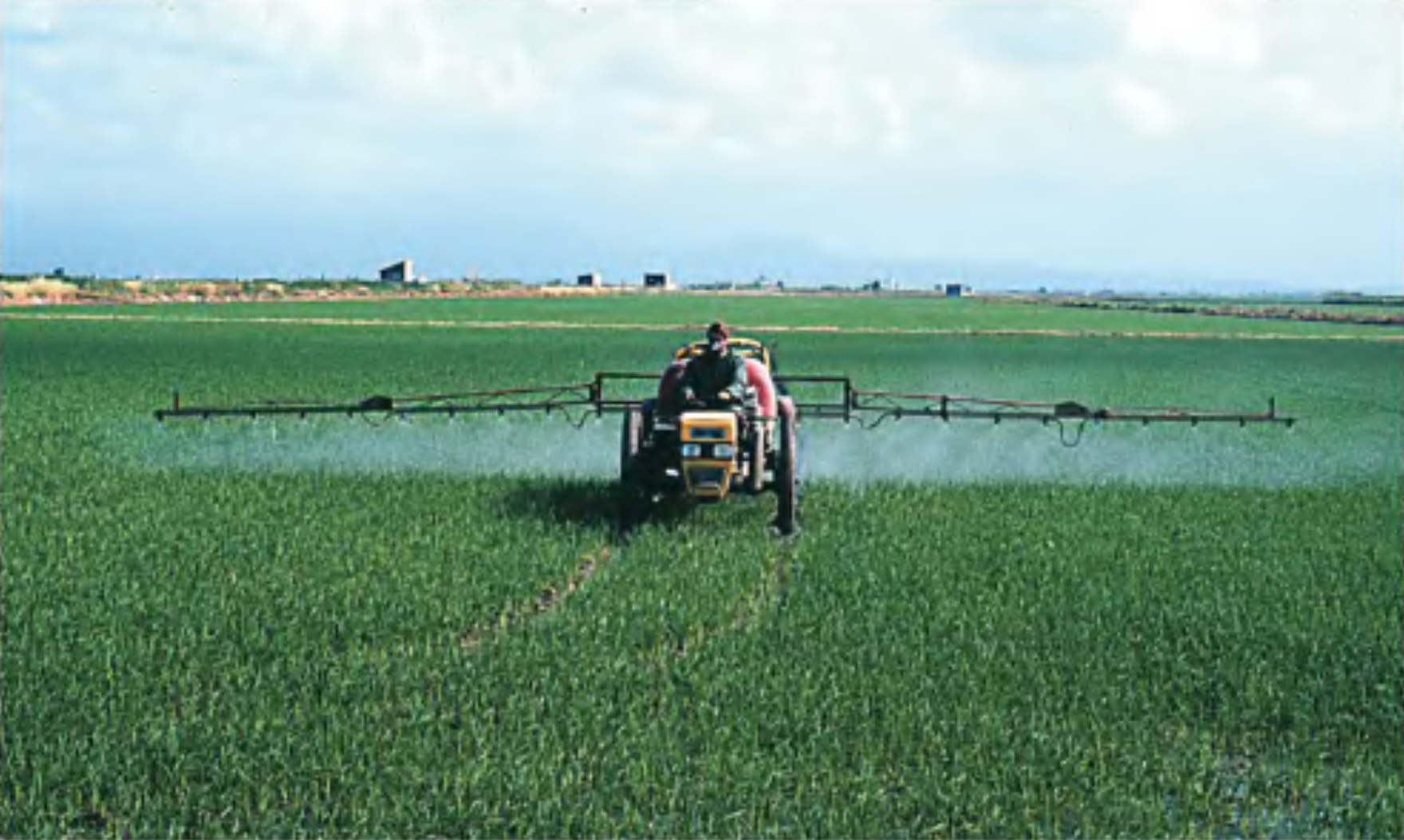
A tractor spraying herbicide onto a field of crops

The above described methods of weed control use no or very limited chemical inputs. They are preferred by organic gardeners or organic farmers.

Weed control can also be achieved by the use of herbicides. Selective herbicides kill certain targets while leaving the desired crop relatively unharmed. Some of these act by interfering with the growth of the weed and are often based on plant hormones. Herbicides are generally classified as follows:

- Contact herbicides destroy only plant tissue that contacts the herbicide. Generally, these are the fastest-acting herbicides. They are ineffective on perennial plants that can re-grow from roots or tubers.
- Systemic herbicides are foliar-applied and move through the plant where they destroy a greater amount of tissue. Glyphosate is currently the most used systemic herbicide.
- Soil-borne herbicides are applied to the soil and are taken up by the roots of the target plant.
- Pre-emergent herbicides are applied to the soil and prevent germination or early growth of weed seeds.

In agriculture large scale and systematic procedures are usually required, often by machines, such as large liquid herbicide "floater" sprayers, or aerial application.

These are thought to likely have several substantial detrimental impacts (e.g. on soils, health and insects) – which may partly explain the development of alternatives – and there are also systematic procedures using herbicides that have lower impacts such as robots and machines that apply low amounts with high precision.

=== Organic approaches ===
Organic weed control involves anything other than applying manufactured chemicals. Typically a combination of methods are used to achieve satisfactory control.

Sulfur in some circumstances is accepted within British Soil Association standards.

=== Bradley method ===
The Bradley method of bush regeneration uses ecological processes to do much of the work.

Perennial weeds also propagate by seeding; the airborne seed of the dandelion and the rose-bay willow herb parachute far and wide. Dandelion and dock also put down deep tap roots, which, although they do not spread underground, are able to regrow from any remaining piece left in the ground.

=== Hybrid ===
One method of maintaining the effectiveness of individual strategies is to combine them with others that work in complete different ways. Thus seed targeting has been combined with herbicides. In Australia seed management has been effectively combined with trifluralin and clethodim.

== Herbicide resistance ==
Resistance occurs when a target plant species does not respond to a chemical that previously used to control it. It has been argued that over-reliance on herbicides along with the absence of any preventive or other cultural practices resulted in the evolution and spread of herbicide-resistant weeds. Increasing number of herbicide resistance weeds around the world has led to warnings on reducing frequent use of herbicides with the same or similar modes of action and combining chemicals with other weed control methods; this is called 'Integrated Weed Management'.

=== Farming practices ===
Herbicide resistance recently became a critical problem as many Australian sheep farmers switched to exclusively growing wheat in their pastures in the 1970s. In wheat fields, introduced varieties of ryegrass, while good for grazing sheep, are intense competitors with wheat. Ryegrasses produce so many seeds that, if left unchecked, they can completely choke a field. Herbicides provided excellent control, while reducing soil disrupting because of less need to plough. Within little more than a decade, ryegrass and other weeds began to develop resistance. Australian farmers evolved again and began diversifying their techniques.

In 1983, patches of ryegrass had become immune to Hoegrass, a family of herbicides that inhibit an enzyme called acetyl coenzyme A carboxylase.

Ryegrass populations were large, and had substantial genetic diversity, because farmers had planted many varieties. Ryegrass is cross-pollinated by wind, so genes shuffle frequently. Farmers sprayed inexpensive Hoegrass year after year, creating selection pressure, but were diluting the herbicide in order to save money, increasing plants survival. Hoegrass was mostly replaced by a group of herbicides that block acetolactate synthase, again helped by poor application practices. Ryegrass evolved a kind of "cross-resistance" that allowed it to rapidly break down a variety of herbicides. Australian farmers lost four classes of herbicides in only a few years. As of 2013 only two herbicide classes, called Photosystem II and long-chain fatty acid inhibitors, had become the last hope.

== Weed societies ==
Internationally, weed societies help collaboration in weed science and management. In North America the Weed Science Society of America (WSSA) was founded in 1956 and publishes three journals: Weed Science, Weed Technology, and Invasive Plant Science and Management. In Britain, European Weed Research Council was established in 1958 and later expanded their scope under the name European Weed Research Society The main journal of this society is Weed Research. Moreover, the Council of Australasian Weed Society (CAWS) serves as a centre for information on Australian weeds, while New Zealand Plant Protection Society (NZPPS) facilitates information sharing in New Zealand.

Strategic weed management is a process of managing weeds at a district, regional or national scale. In Australia the first published weed management strategies were developed in Tasmania, New South Wales and South Australian 1999, followed by the National Weeds Strategy in 1999.

== See also ==
- Control of Bramble
- Crop weed
- Integrated pest management
- Invasive species
- Mechanical weed control
- Mulch
- Noxious weed
- Pesticide application
