= Mechanical weed control =

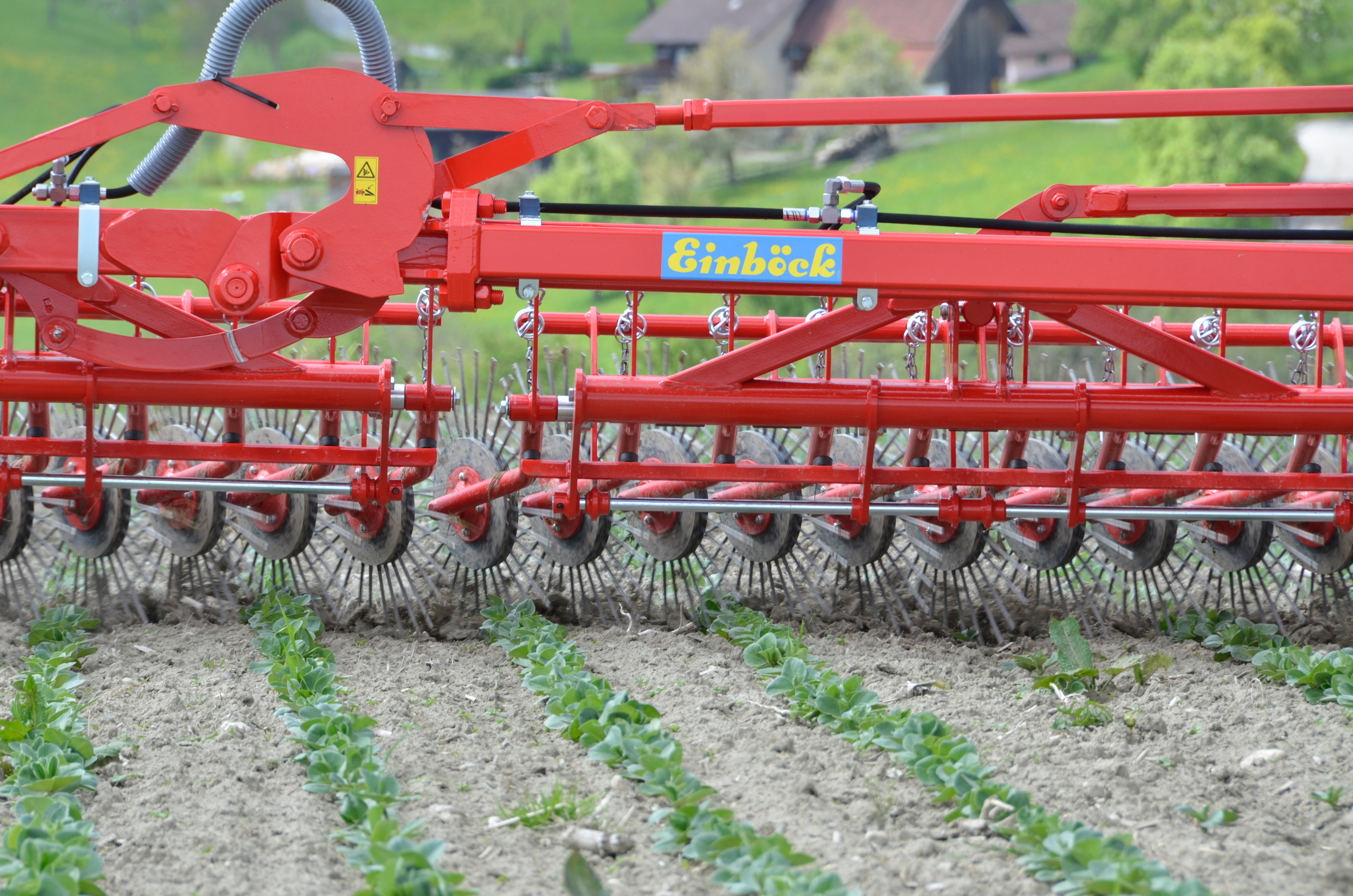
Inter-row hoeing

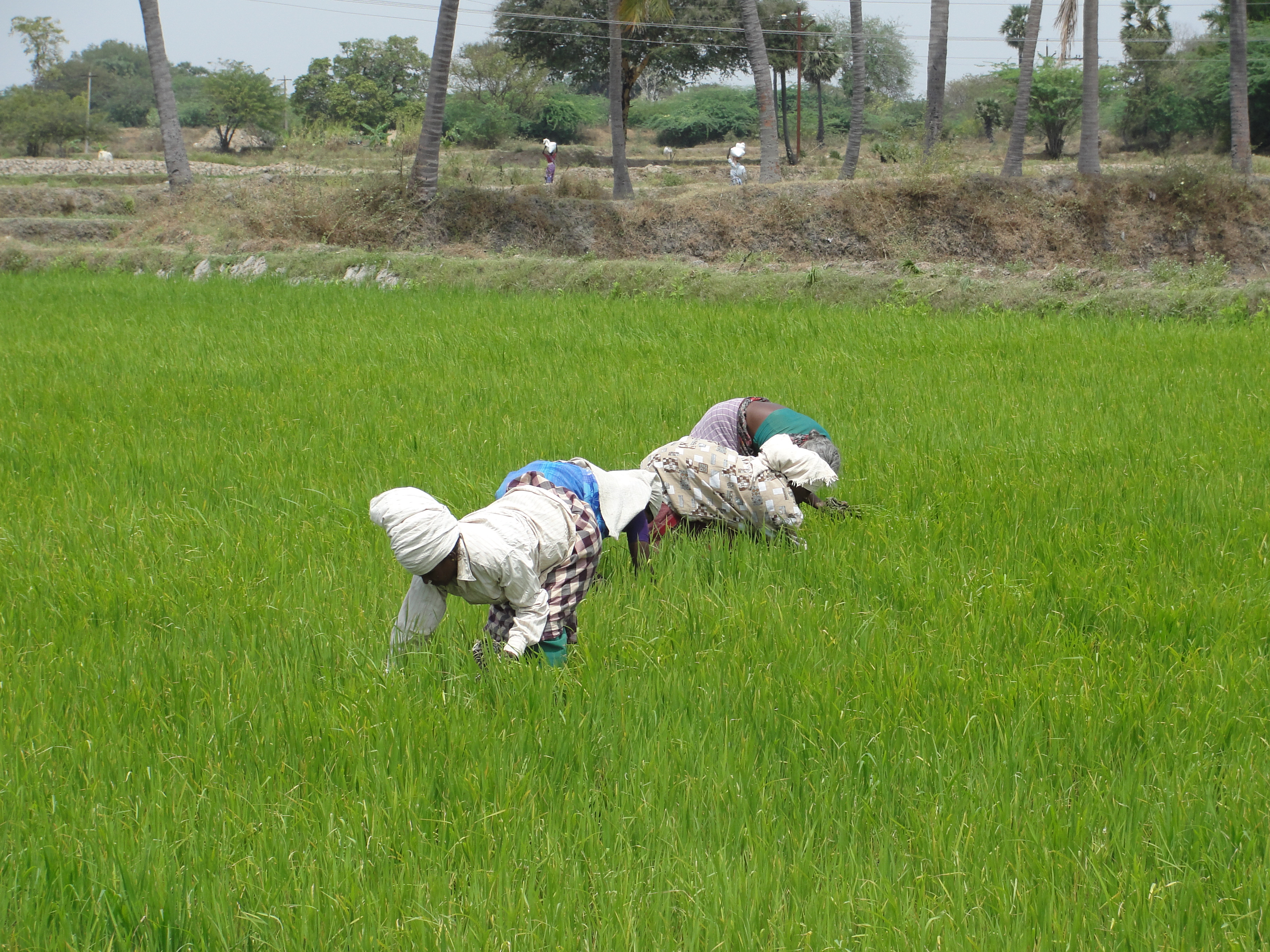
Manual weeding in Tamil Nadu

Mechanical weed control is a physical activity that inhibits unwanted plant growth. Mechanical, or manual, weed control techniques manage weed populations through physical methods that remove, injure, kill, or make the growing conditions unfavorable. Some of these methods cause direct damage to the weeds through complete removal or causing a lethal injury. Other techniques may alter the growing environment by eliminating light, increasing the temperature of the soil, or depriving the plant of carbon dioxide or oxygen. Mechanical control techniques can be either selective or non-selective. A selective method has very little impact on non-target plants where as a non-selective method affects the entire area that is being treated. If mechanical control methods are applied at the optimal time and intensity, some weed species may be controlled or even eradicated.

== Methods ==
=== Weed pulling ===
Pulling methods uproot and remove the weed from the soil. Weed pulling can be used to control some shrubs, tree saplings, and herbaceous plants. Annuals and tap-rooted weeds tend to be very susceptible to pulling. Many species are able to re-sprout from root segments that are left in the soil. Therefore, the effectiveness of this method is dependent on the removal of as much of the root system as possible. Well established perennial weeds are much less effectively controlled because of the difficulty of removing all of the root system and perennating plant parts. Small herbaceous weeds may be pulled by hand, but larger plants may require the use of puller tools like the Weed Wrench or the Root Talon. This technique has a little to no impact on neighboring, non-target plants and has a minimal effect on the growing environment. However, pulling is labor-intensive and time-consuming, making it a more suitable method to use for small weed infestations.

=== Mowing ===
Mowing methods cut or shreds the above ground of the weed and can prevent and reduce seed populations as well as restrict the growth of weeds. Mowing can be a very successful control method for many annual weeds. Mowing is the most effective when it is performed before the weeds are able to set seed because it can reduce the number of flower stalks and prevent the spread of more seed. However, the biology of the weed must be considered before mowing. Some weed species may sprout with increased vigor after being mowed. Also, some species are able to re-sprout from stem or root segments that are left behind after mowing. Brush cutting and weed eating are also mowing techniques that reduce the biomass of the weeds. Repeatedly removing biomass causes reduced vigor in many weed species. This method is usually used in combination with other control methods such as burning or herbicide treatments.

=== Mulching ===
Mulch is a layer of material that is spread on the ground. Compared with some other methods of weed control, laying weed mulch mat is relatively simple and inexpensive. Mulching smothers the weeds by excluding light and providing a physical barrier to impede their emergence. Mulching is successful with most annual weeds, however, some perennial weeds are not affected. Mulches may be organic or synthetic. Organic mulches consist of plant by products such as: pine straw, wood chips, green waste, compost, leaves, and grass clippings. Synthetic mulches, also known as ground cover fabric, can be made from materials like polyethylene, polypropylene, or polyester. The effectiveness of mulching is mostly dependent on the material used. Organic and synthetic mulches may be used in combination with each other to increase the amount of weeds controlled.

=== Tillage ===
Tillage, also known as cultivation, is the turning over of the soil. This method is more often used in agricultural crops. Tillage can be performed on a small scale with tools such as small, hand pushed rotary tillers or on a large scale with tractor mounted plows. Tillage is able to control weeds because when the soil is overturned, the vegetative parts of the plants are damaged and the root systems are exposed causing desiccation. Generally, the younger the weed is, the more readily it can be controlled with tillage. To control mature perennial weeds, repeated tillage is necessary. By continually destroying new growth and damaging the root system, the weed's food stores are depleted until it can no longer re-sprout. Also, when the soil is overturned, the soil seed bank is disrupted which can cause dormant weed seeds to germinate in the absence of the previous competitors. These new weeds can also be controlled by continued tillage until the soil seed bank is depleted.

=== Soil solarization ===
Soil solarization involves covering the soil with a layer of clear or black plastic which traps heat energy from the sun and raises the temperature of the soil. Many weed seeds and vegetative propagules are not able to withstand the temperatures and are killed. For this method to be most effective, it needs to be implemented during the summer months and the soil should be moist. Cool season weeds are more susceptible to soil solarization than are warm season weeds. Using black plastic as a cover excludes light which can help to control plants that are growing whereas clear plastic has been shown to produce higher soil temperatures.

=== Fire ===
Burning and flaming can be economical and practical methods of weed control if used carefully. For most plants, fire causes the cell walls to rupture when they reach a temperature of 45 °C (113 °F) to 55 °C (131 °F). Burning is commonly used to control weeds in forests, ditches, and roadsides. Burning can be used to remove accumulated vegetation by destroying the dry, matured plant matter as well as killing the green new growth. Buried weed seeds and plant propagules may also be destroyed during burning, however, dry seeds are much less susceptible to the increased temperature. Flaming is used on a smaller scale and includes the use of a propane torch with a fan tip. Flaming may be used to control weeds along fences and paved areas or places where the soil may be too wet to hoe, dig, or till. Flaming is most effective on young weeds that are less than two inches tall but repeated treatments may control tougher perennial weeds.

=== Lasers ===
In precision agriculture, novel agricultural robots can use lasers for weed control. Their benefits may include "healthier crops and soil, decreased herbicide use, and reduced chemical and labor costs".

=== Flooding ===
Flooding is a method of control that requires the area being treated to be saturated at a depth of 15 to 30 cm for a period of 3 to 8 weeks. The saturation of the soil reduces the availability of oxygen to the plant roots thereby killing the weed. This method has been shown to be highly effective in controlling establish perennial weeds and may also suppress annual weeds by reducing the weed seed populations.

== Environmental effects ==
Mechanical methods of weed control cause physical changes in the immediate environment that may cause positive or negative effects. The suppression of the targeted weeds will open niches in the environment and may also stimulate the growth of other weeds by decreasing their competition and making their environment more favorable. If the niches are not filled by a desirable plant, they will eventually be taken over by another weed. These weed control methods also effect the structure of the soil. The use of mulches can help decrease erosion, decrease water evaporation from the soil, as well as improve the soil structure by increasing the amount of organic matter. Tillage practices can help decrease compaction and aerate the soil. On the other hand, tillage has also been shown to decrease soil moisture, increase soil erosion and runoff, as well as decrease soil microbial populations. Solarization can cause changes in the biological, physical, and chemical properties of the soil. This can cause the soil to be an unfavorable environment for native species which may be beneficial or harmful.

== See also ==
- Aquatic weed harvester
