= Berky =

German company

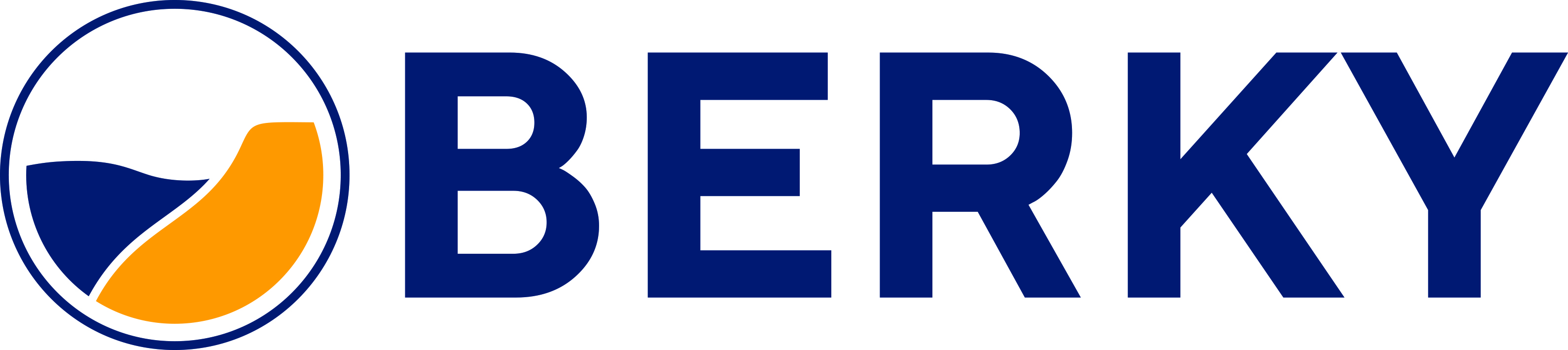
- Company type: GmbH
- Industry: Water maintenance
- Founded: 1964
- Founder: Anton Berkenheger
- Headquarters: Haren (Ems), Germany
- Area served: Worldwide
- Key people: Gerhard Knoll, Josef Göcking, Felix Knoll, Frank Suelmann
- Products: Aquatic weed harvesters Mowing boats Dredge boats Slope mower Flail mower
- Website: www.berky.de

The Berky GmbH (former Anton Berkenheger GmbH & Co. KG) is a German company that manufactures machines, specialized vehicles and boats for water maintenance. The company is based in Haren (Ems) in the Emsland region.

== History ==
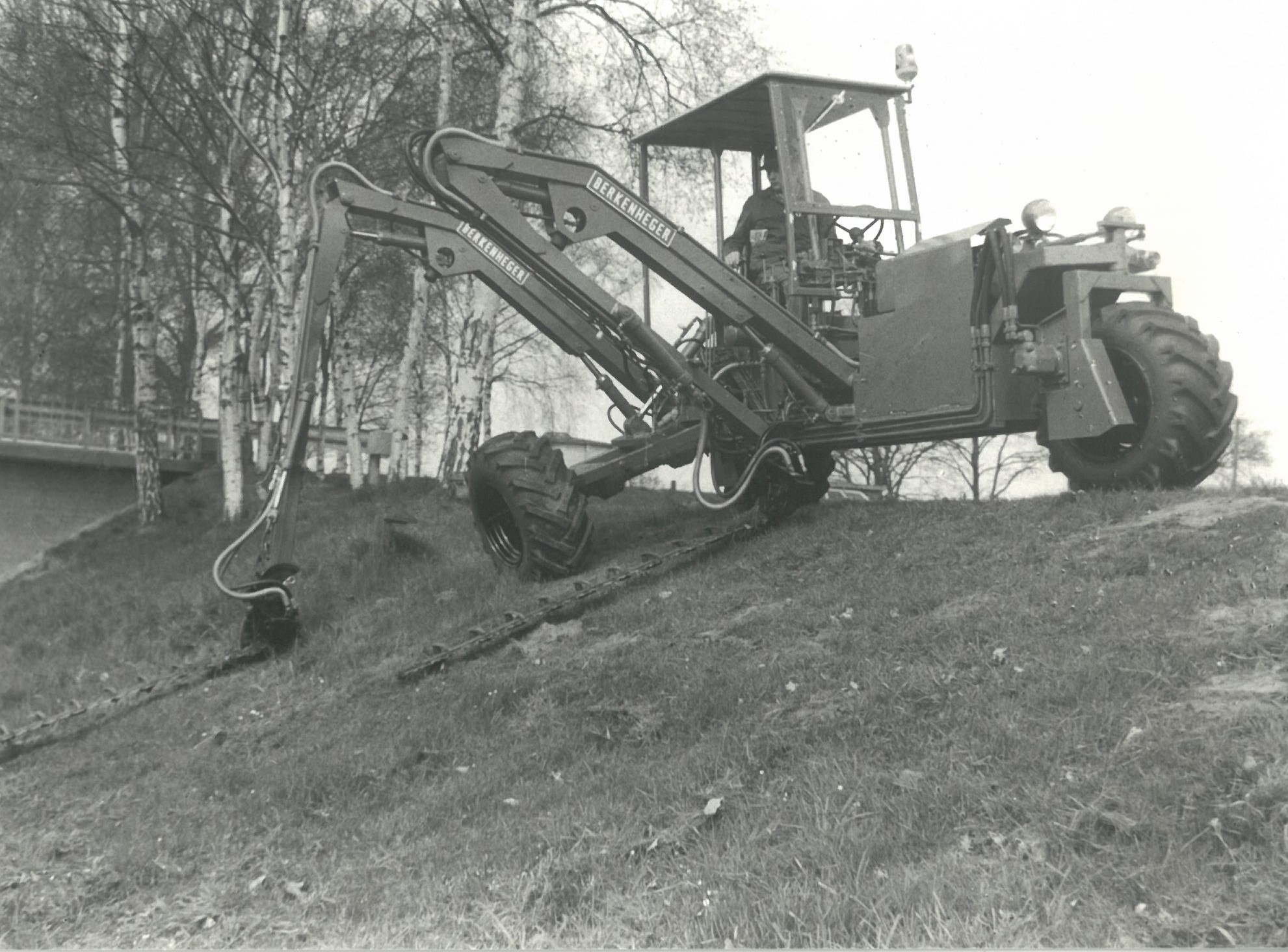
Predecessor model of the today produced slope mower

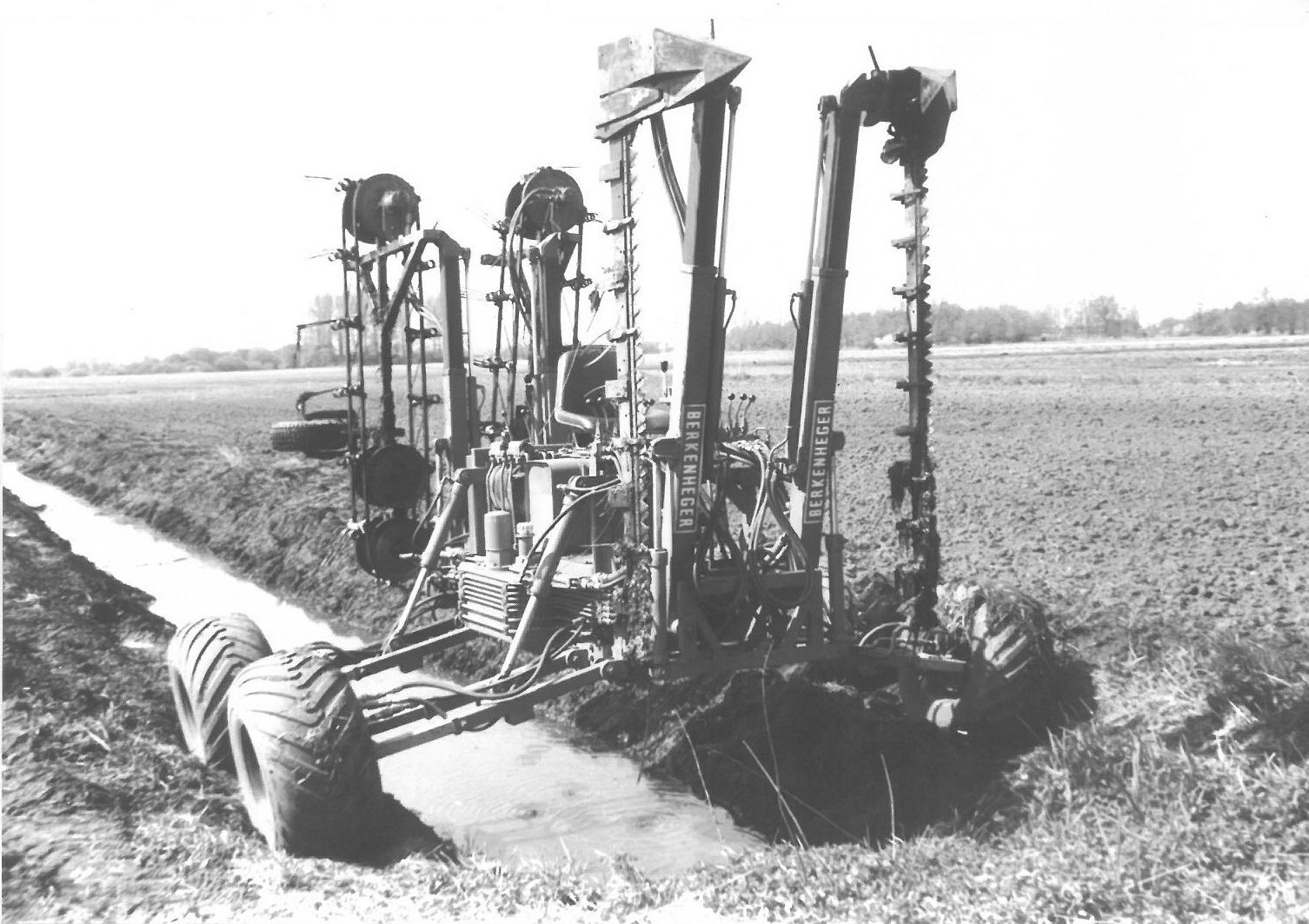
Slope mower in the year 1980

The co-founder, farmer and chairman of the Meersbach Water and Soil Association, Anton Berkenheger received the first patent for a hydraulic, three-wheeled special machines for mowing ditch banks in 1963. Together with the civil engineer Gerhard Knoll and Josef Göcking, he founded Anton Berkenheger & Co. KG in Haren-Erika.By 1968, they already employed 15 people.

In the same year, the company moved to a production facility at the Haren harbour. In 1977, a new production facility was built in Haren-Emmeln with a total area of 1,500 m^{2} for production, storage and office. It was expanded in the following years to a total area of about 3,000 m^{2}. By the mid-1980s, the company was already manufacturing and distributing slope mowers, tractor attachments, mowing boats and forklifts in Germany.

Since the 1990s, the distribution of special vehicles and machines was also expanded abroad. At the end of 2015, the company Senwatec joined the Anton Berkenheger Group. This made it possible to produce other types of special boats, such as amphibious dredge boats. The company Gilbers from Geeste also became part of Berky in 2019. Through this acquisition, additional mowing machines and attachments, such as flail and double-knife mowers, were produced.

== Machines ==
=== Vehicles ===
The land vehicles produced by Berky include a three-wheeled slope mower, which was designed for ditch clearing and embankment mowing.

=== Boats ===
==== Aquatic weed harvesters and mowing boats ====
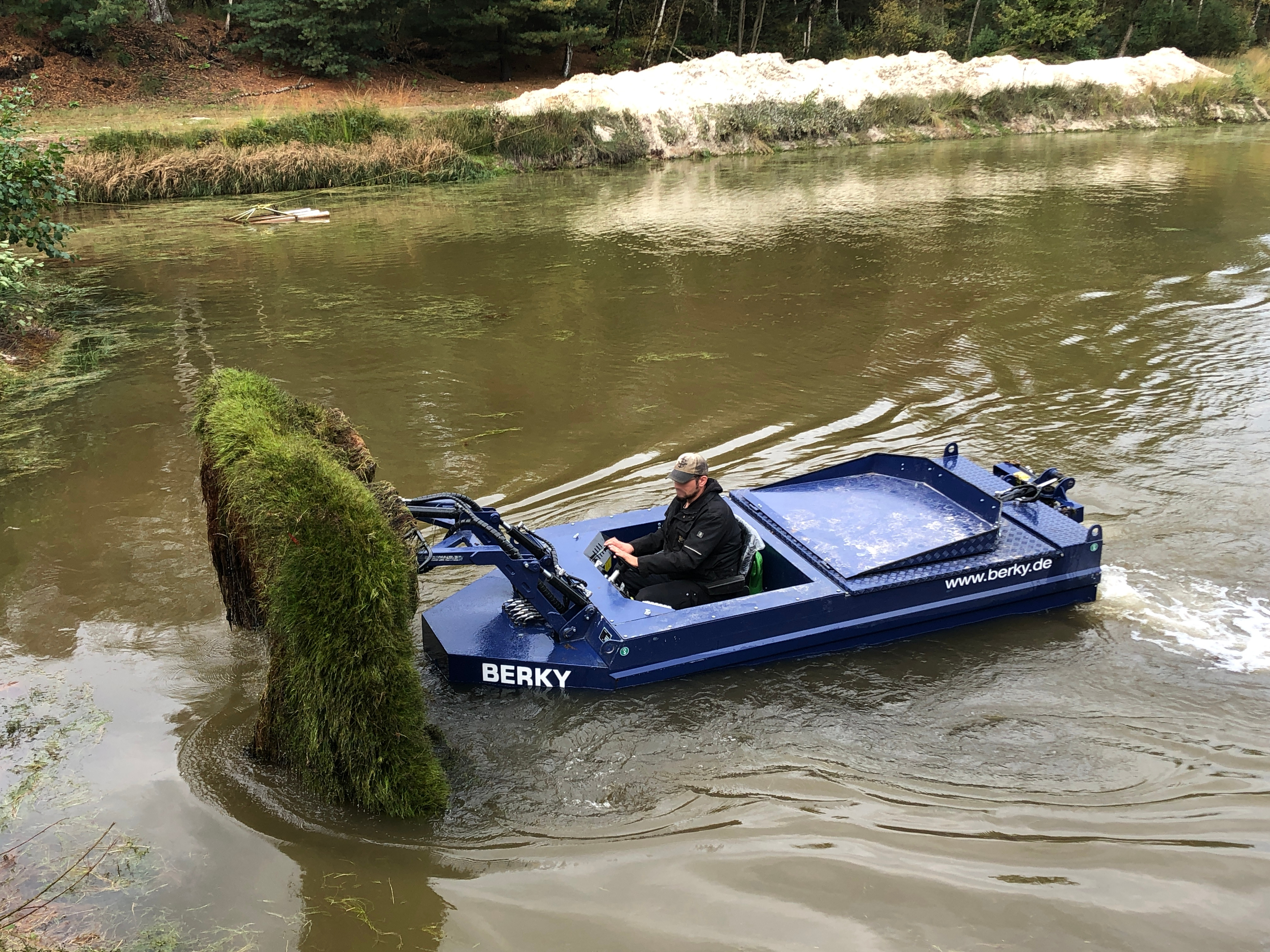
Mowing boat with front clearing rake

Collecting and unloading waste from an Indonesian river

Berky produces a range of mowing boats and aquatic weed harvesters. While mowing boats are equipped with different machines and tools, such as double knife T-cutting units or front collecting rakes, for cutting and collecting aquatic plants, aquatic weed harvesters cut plants at the front of the boat by using a U-shaped double-knife unit and simultaneously collect them on a loading area via a front conveyor belt that reaches underneath the water surface. In the reverse direction, the collected plant material is unloaded on shore via said conveyor belt.

==== Specialized garbage collecting boats ====
By using aquatic weed harvesters, especially in the Asian region, it was noticed that the specialized boats are also suitable for cleaning waters from debris and removing plastic waste. Due to this discovery, the aquatic weed harvesters were converted into special garbage collecting boats. The waste floating on the water surface is collected by the conveyor belt, that is reaching into the water and transported to the loading area of the boat. Nowadays, garbage collecting boats are used worldwide, for example in Indonesia, Slovakia or Jamaica. Custom made aquatic weed harvesters can also retrieve larger debree or waste pieces by using a clamshell bucket.

=== Amphibious vehicles ===
The company also produces specialized amphibious vehicles.

=== Tools and special machines ===
Aside from boats and land vehicles, Berky manufactures tools and machines for water maintenance. In addition to various mowers, such as double-knife cutting units, flail mowers or mowing baskets, the company also produces machines for woodland maintenance, such as mechanic loppers and tree saws.

=== Gallery ===
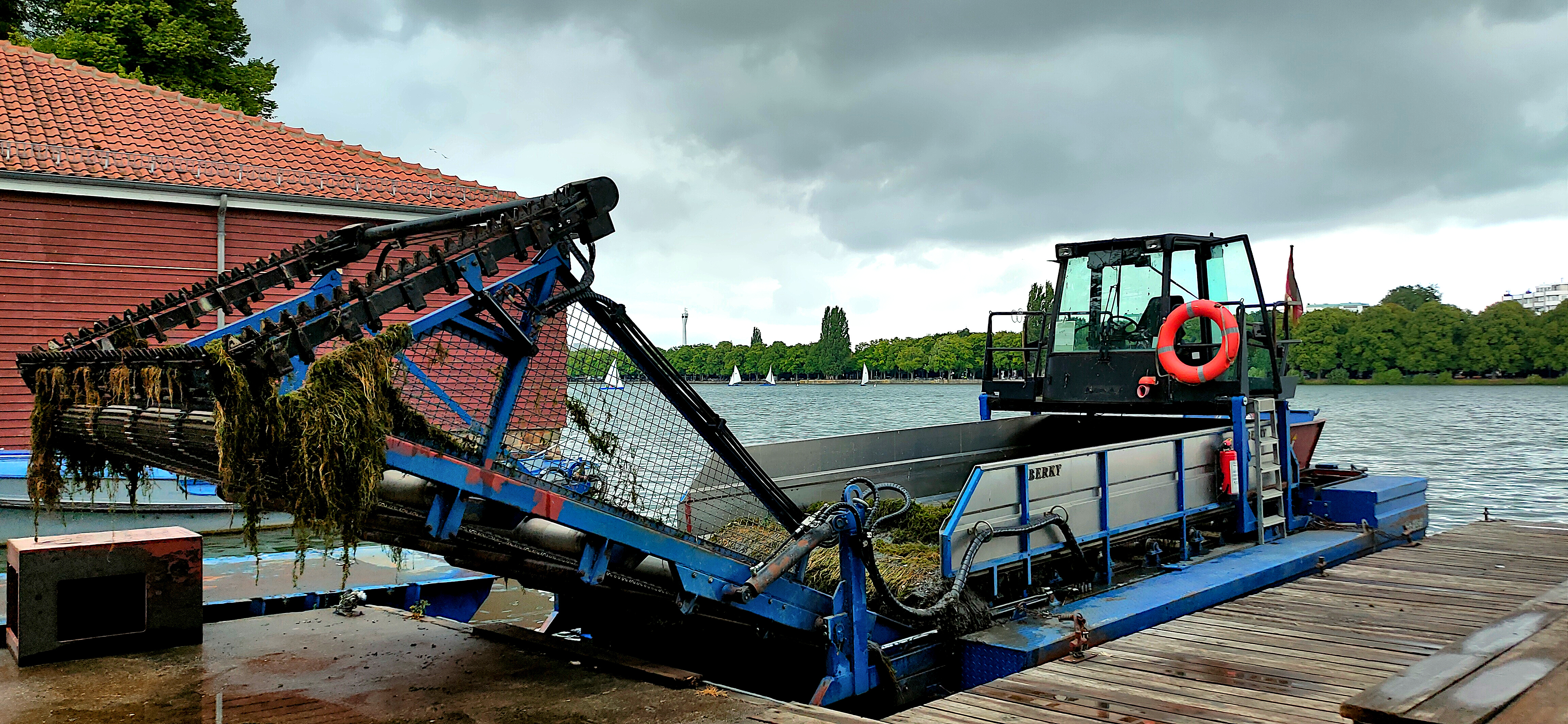
Aquatic weed harvester

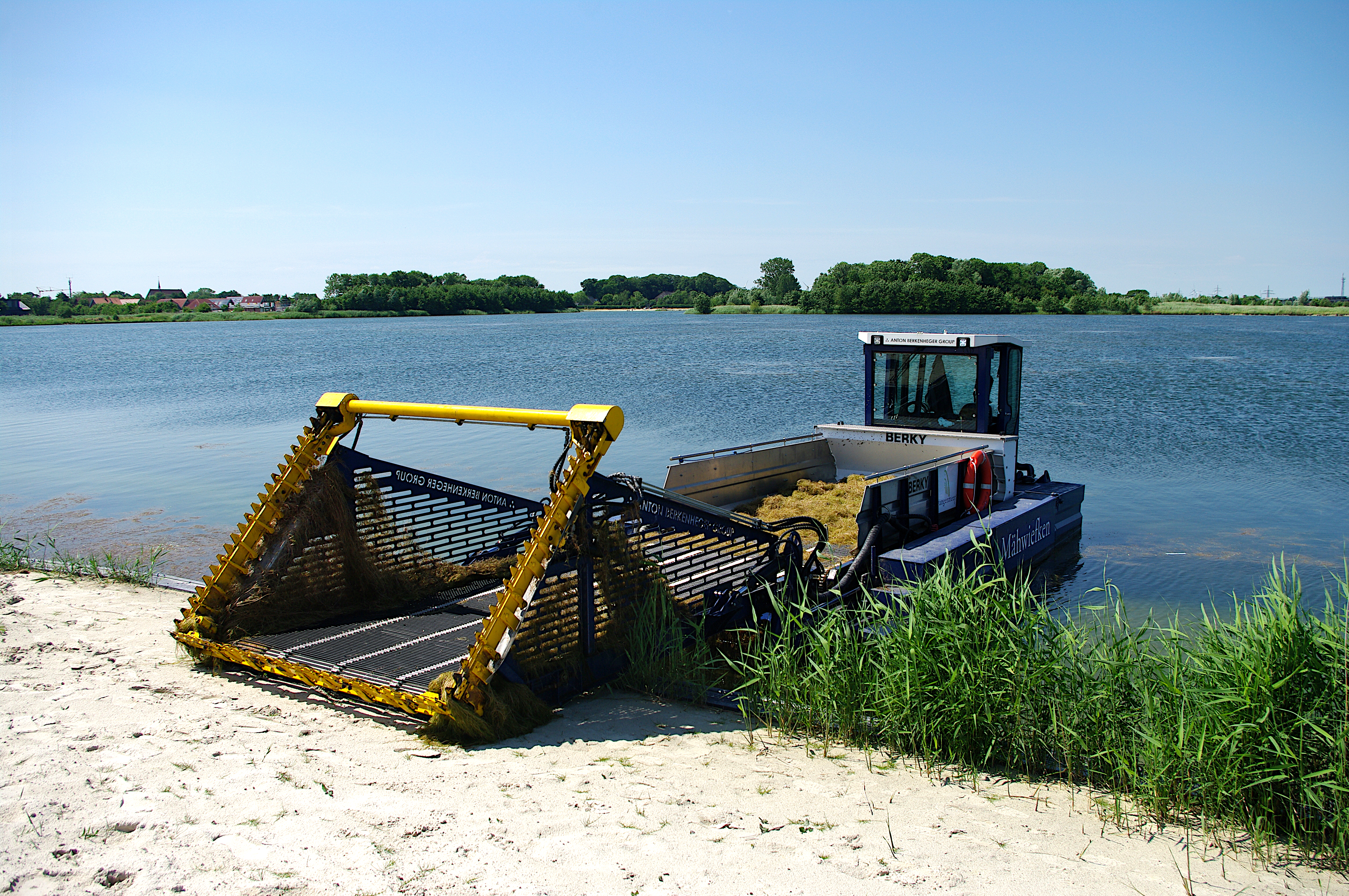
Small aquatic weed harvester with U-shaped double-knife cutting unit

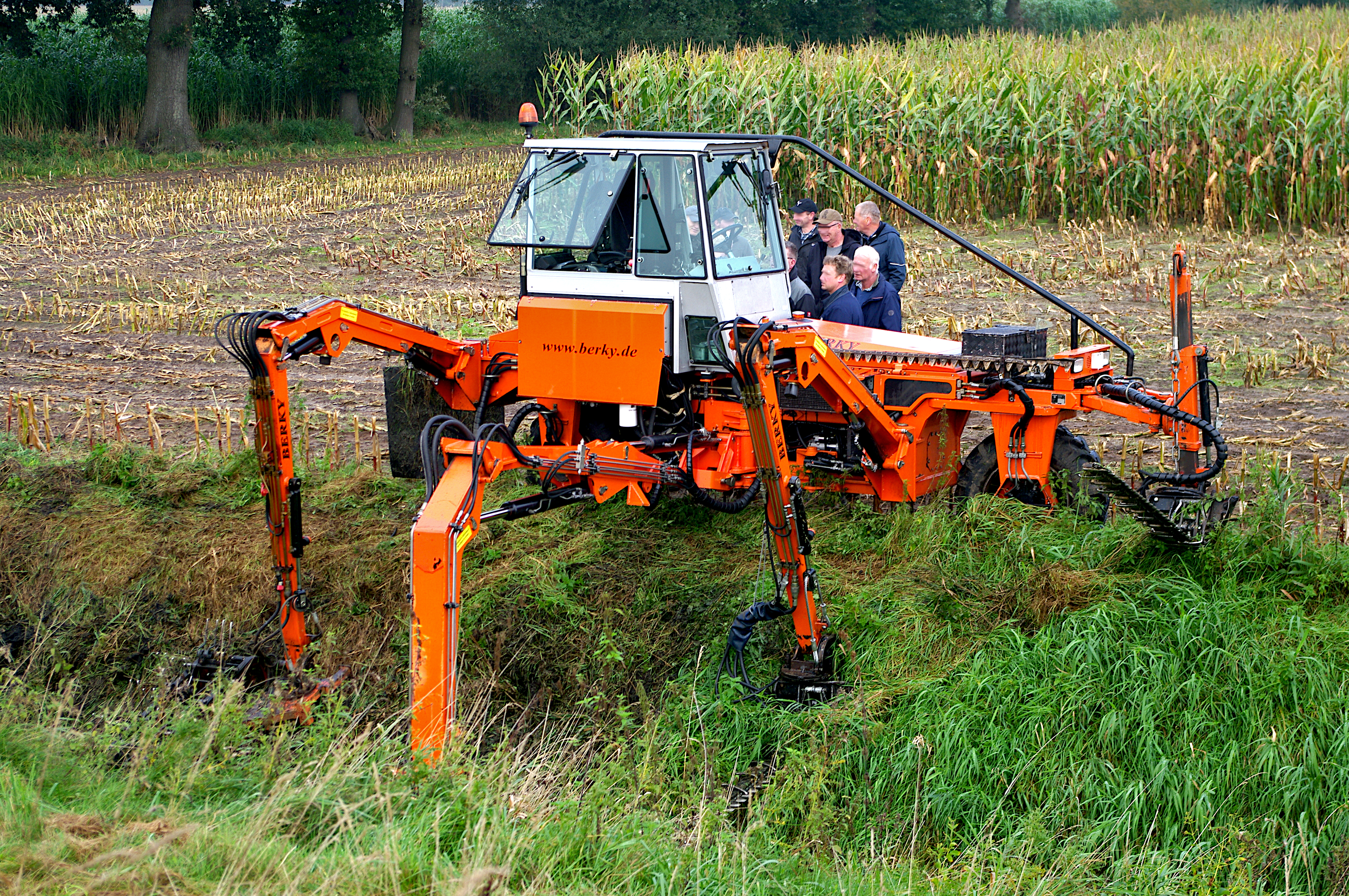
Three wheeled slope mower

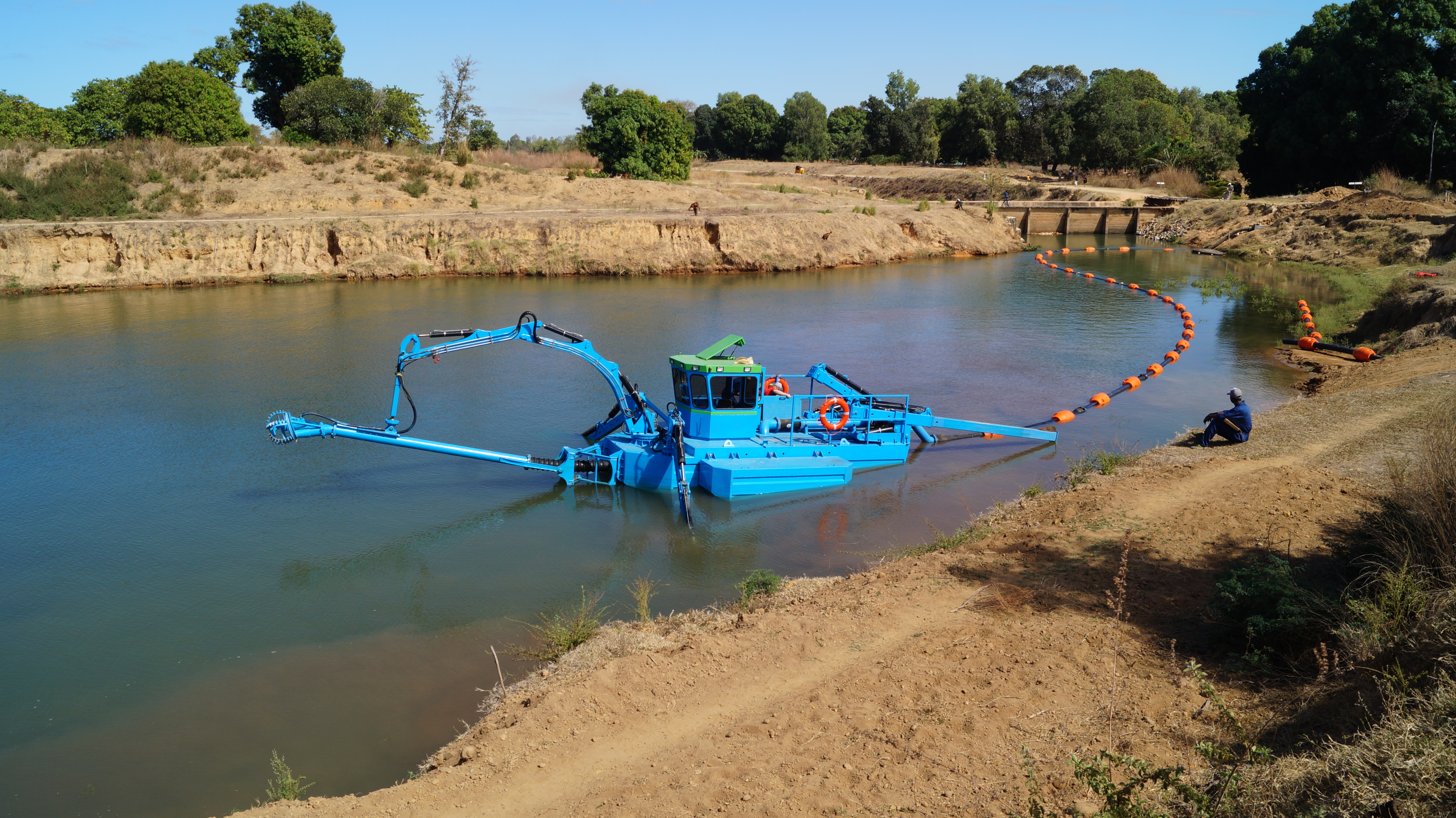
Dredge boat with hydraulic stilts and transport tube

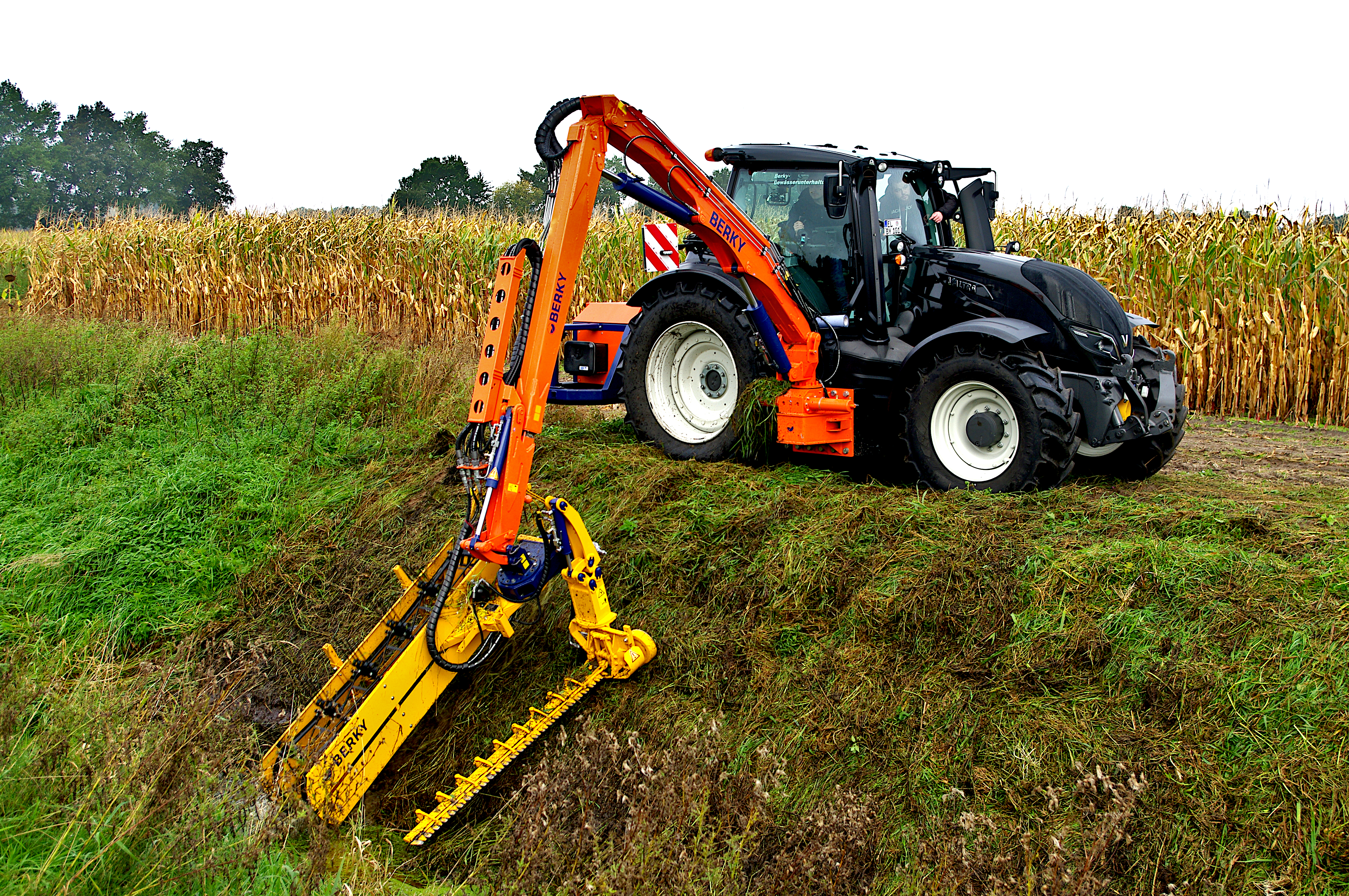
Mower-rake combination

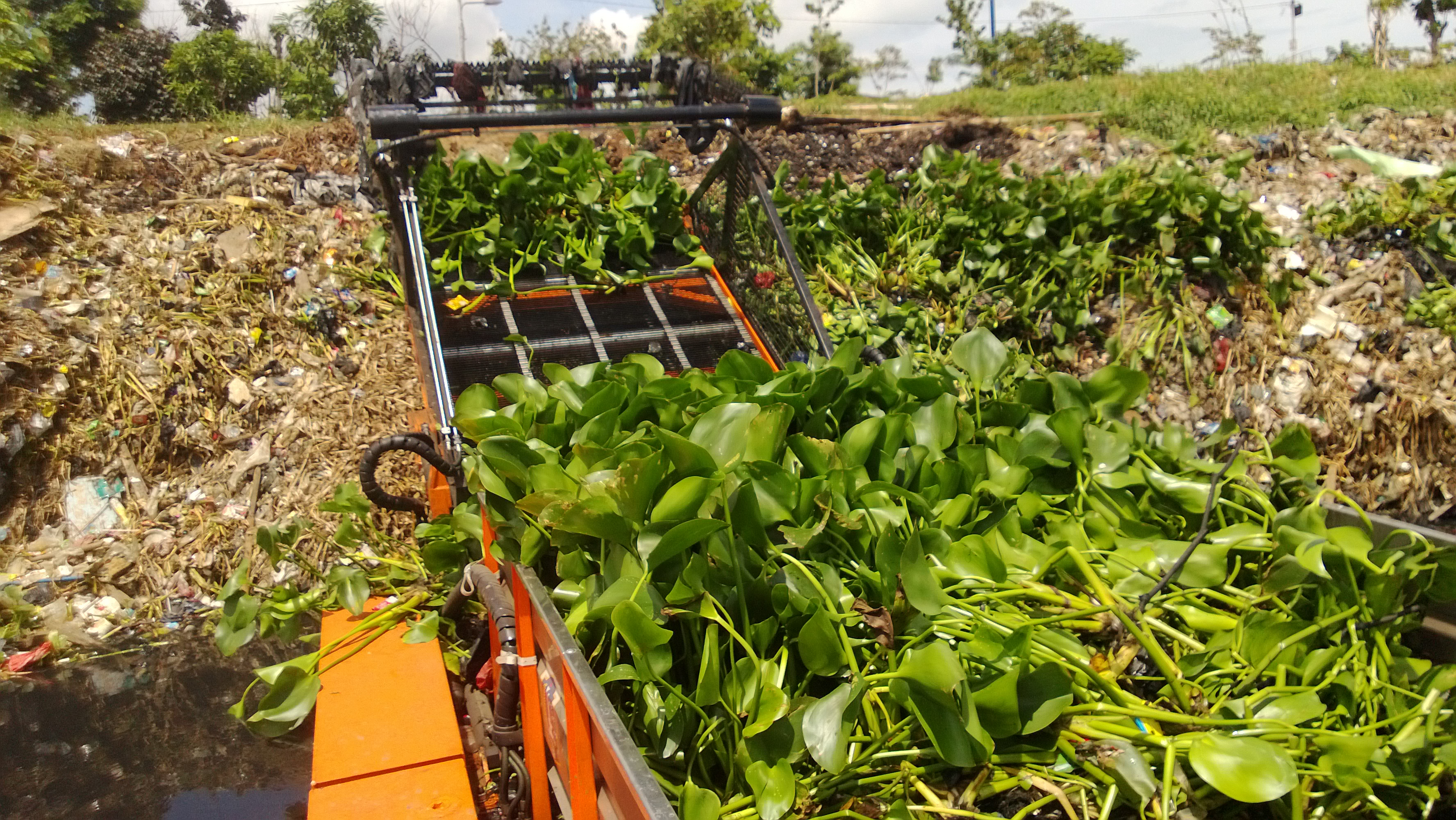
Aquatic weed harvester unloading Common water hyacinth

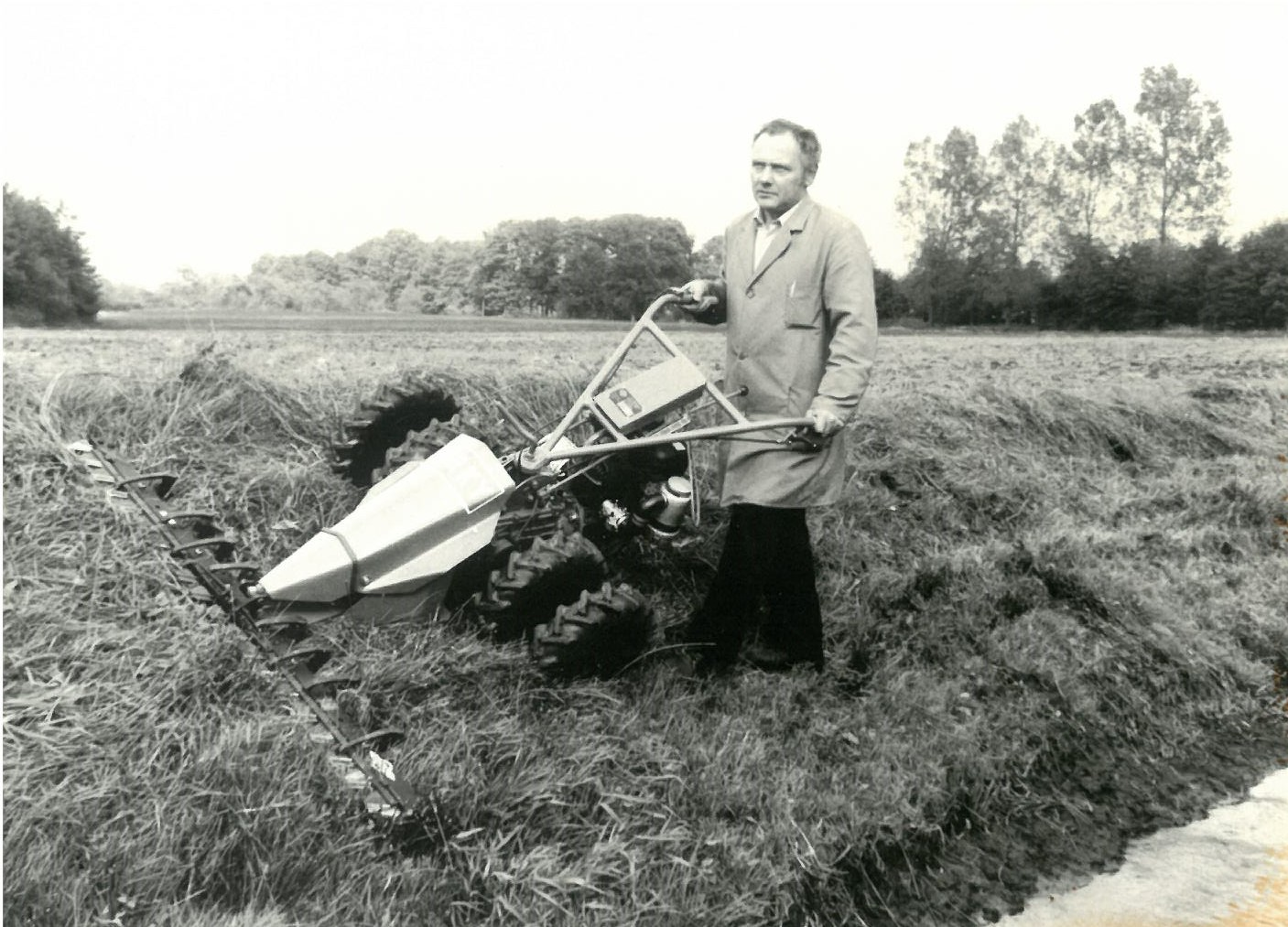
Formerly produced hand-operated double-knife mower

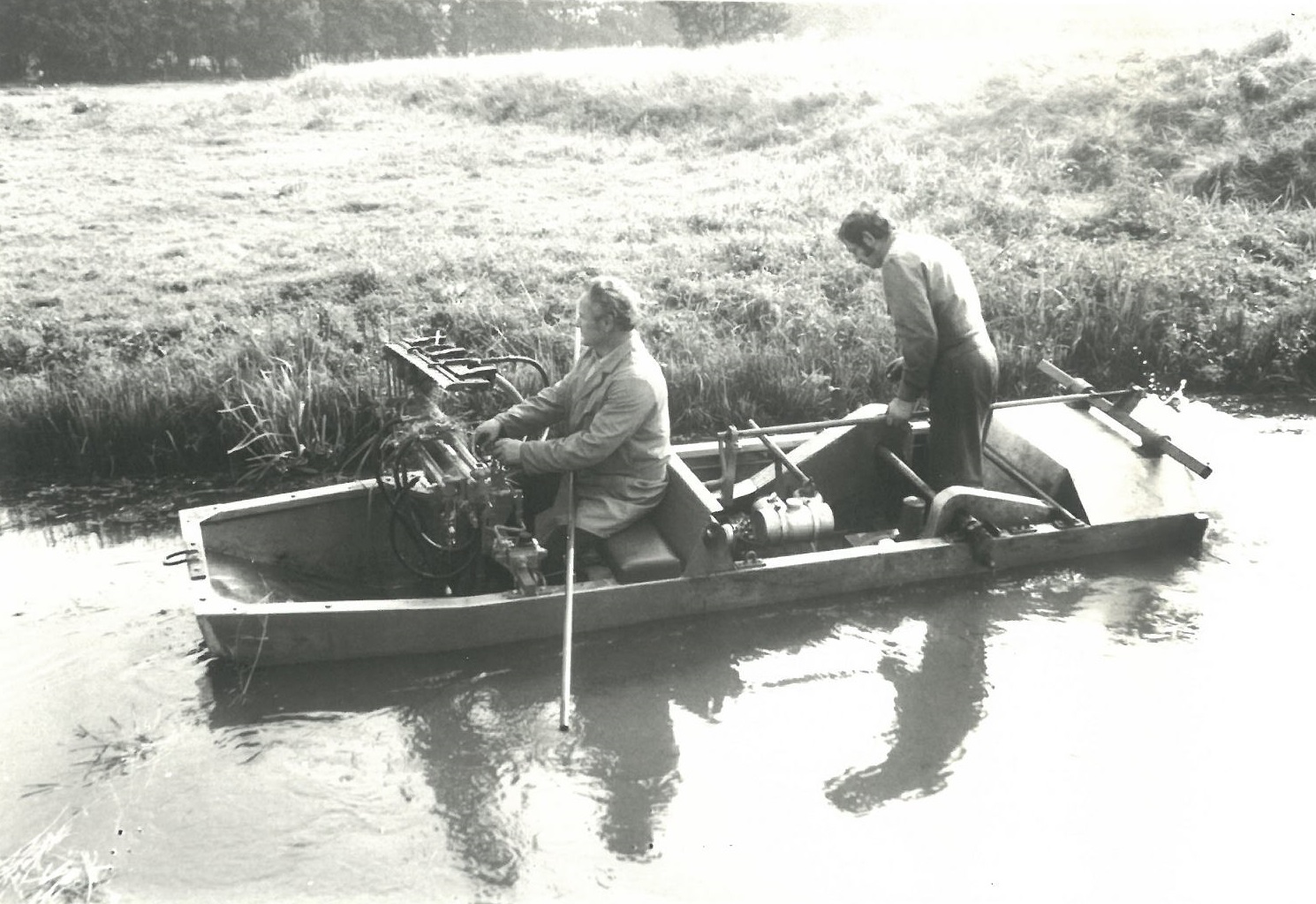
Predecessor of the today produced mowing boat
