= Disease suppressive soils =

Disease suppressive soils function to prevent the establishment of pathogens in the rhizosphere of plants. These soils develop through the establishment of beneficial microbes, known as plant growth-promoting rhizobacteria (PGPR) in the rhizosphere of plant roots. These mutualistic microbes function to increase plant health by fighting against harmful soil microbes either directly or indirectly. As beneficial bacteria occupy space around plant roots they outcompete harmful pathogens by releasing pathogenic suppressive metabolites. Recent research has demonstrated that disease-suppressive soils not only inhibit soilborne pathogens but also protect plants from insect pests. In particular, these soils can enhance plant resistance to leaf-feeding insects by promoting beneficial rhizosphere bacteria and priming plant defense mechanisms.

== PGPR and harmful soil microbes ==
Plant growth promoting rhizobacteria are bacteria that promote plant growth, through fixing nitrogen, producing growth hormones, or even suppressing pathogens. A variety of PGPR genera provide a wide array of functions that directly improve plant health. Bacteria genera Rhizobium and Mesorhizobium work to fix nitrogen into a usable form. Actinomyces and Azospirillum produce growth hormones that increase root growth and uptake of nutrients.

While many of these genera increase plant health directly some PGPR promote plant health indirectly through pathogen suppression. Pathogenic fungi create a complex of hyphae that migrate through the soil. When these fungi reach the rhizosphere they release enzymes that degrade the cell wall of plant root cells. This allows them to enter and infect the host plant and prevent the uptake of nutrients. Beneficial Pseudomonas and Bacillus produce fungal suppressing metabolites that break up this migrating fungal hyphae. Over time, plants are able to create disease-suppressive soils in response to these pathogens through the increasing the abundance of these PGPR in their rhizosphere area.

== Establishment of suppressive soils ==
Plants respond to pathogens by recruiting PGPR to their root rhizosphere from the bulk soil to fill in and prevent pathogen establishment. This ultimately leads to the development of disease-suppressive soils. PGPR are recruited through the natural release plant exudates from root cells as they push through the soil. Different species of plants release different exudates and therefore recruit different microbial communities to their rhizosphere from the microbes already present in the surrounding bulk soil.

If a beneficial microbe genera is not present in a soil plants are not able to recruit it as a defense. Therefore, suppressive soils are a function of the microbes already present in a soil and able to be recruited. The creation of these soils must be done by increasing PGPR in the overall bulk soil. Specific plants are able to recruit beneficial bacteria through the secretion of different root exudates. A greater diversity of plants in a soil leads to a greater diversity of microbes in the rhizosphere and furthermore can lead to greater suppression of soil diseases. Management, such as informed crop rotation and soil solarization, can create suppressive soils that naturally suppress pathogens.
