= Haren, Germany =

Town in Germany

Haren (Ems)
- Town
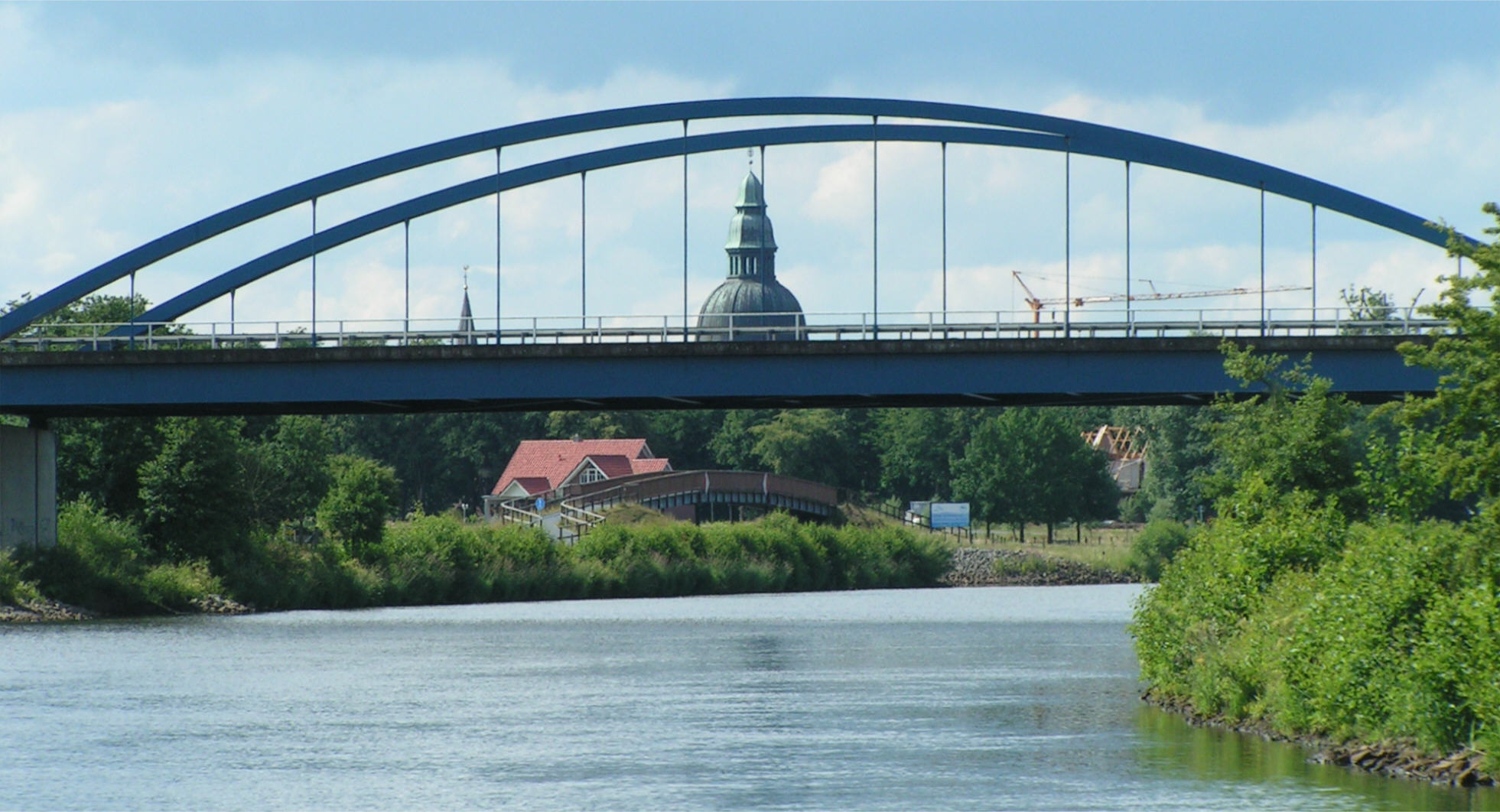
- View towards the town centre of Haren

- Flag Coat of arms

- Location of Haren (Ems) within Emsland district
- Interactive map of Haren (Ems)
- Location within Germany Location within Lower Saxony
- Coordinates: 52°46′N 07°13′E
- Country: Germany
- State: Lower Saxony
- District: Emsland
- Subdivisions: 12 Ortsteile

Government
  - Mayor (2019–24): Markus Honnigfort (CDU)

Area
  - Total: 208.79 km^{2} (80.61 sq mi)
- Elevation: 9–15 m (30–49 ft)

Population (2025-12-31)
  - Total: 24,175
  - Density: 115.79/km^{2} (299.88/sq mi)
- Time zone: UTC+01:00 (CET)
  - Summer (DST): UTC+02:00 (CEST)
- Postal codes: 49733
- Dialling codes: 05932
- Vehicle registration: EL
- Website: www.haren.de

Haren (German pronunciation: [ˈhaːʁən]; Polish 1945: Lwów, Polish 1945–1948: Maczków) is a town in Lower Saxony, Germany in the district of Emsland.

== History ==
Haren was first mentioned in the Middle Ages (around 890) in a registry of the Corvey Abbey. Around 1150 the settlement of Neuharen ("New Haren") was founded, while the nearby Altharen ("Old Haren") formed around a local castle, belonging to the bishop of Münster, who bought it around 1252 from Duchess Jutta von Ravensberg. At the end of the Thirty Years War Haren was almost completely destroyed, but soon recovered and became a notable trading port at the Ems River. The inhabitants of Haren were in large part tradesmen and sailors, transporting grain and other commodities down the Ems River.

During the Napoleonic epoch in 1803, the town was given to the Duke of Arenberg as compensation for the lands on the other side of the river. However, already in 1810, the town was directly incorporated into the French Empire. At the Congress of Vienna Haren, together with the entire Duchy of Arenberg-Meppen, was assigned to the Kingdom of Hanover, which in turn in 1866 became part of the Kingdom of Prussia and then the German Empire. Following the Franco-Prussian War a large prisoner of war camp was set up in the vicinity. The French prisoners built, among other facilities, the Haren-Rütenbrock canal, thanks to which peat started to be produced in the area. Despite all the changes, until 1913 both settlements were directly administered by the church. Only then did the German government take over the administrative area of Meppen, to which Haren belonged.

By 1935 there were 205 ships of various sizes registered in Haren. While some of them were mobilised and lost at sea during World War II, Haren remains a notable port of registry for German ships. Altharen and Neuharen were finally united in October 1956 and in December 1965 Haren received city rights.

=== Polish enclave ===
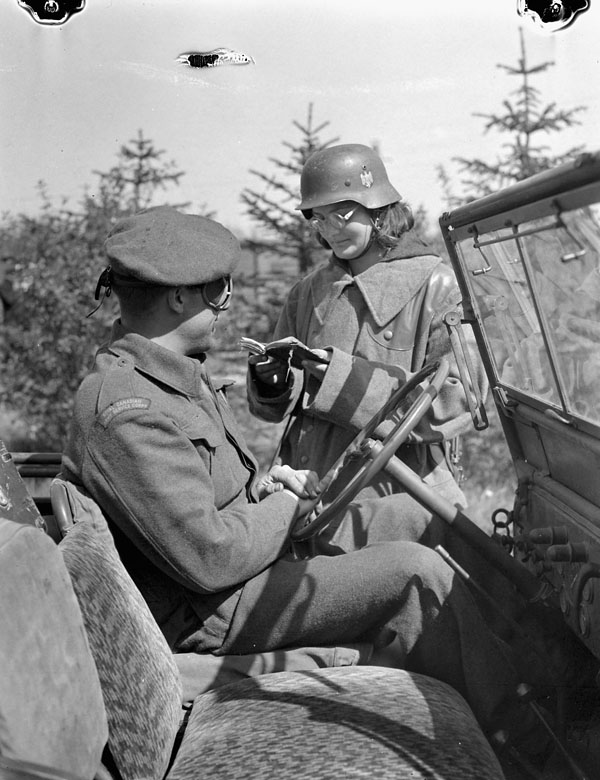
Polish servicewoman near Haren

At the end of World War II, there were over 3 million Polish citizens in Germany, most of them displaced persons (DPs) who got there either as slave labourers, prisoners of German concentration camps or prisoners-of-war. As the political situation in Communist-controlled Poland was uncertain, the Allied authorities decided to create a Polish enclave in Germany that would serve both as a resettlement camp, local cultural centre and a station from which the DPs could further be dispatched to Poland or various western states. As Haren lay in the occupation zone administered by the Polish I Corps (and more specifically the Polish 1st Armoured Division), it was chosen as the most appropriate centre of a Polish enclave in Germany.

On 19 May 1945, the Polish 1st Armoured Division, a unit attached to the British Army moved all of the thousand families of Haren out to surrounding communities. Over 4000 Poles from labour camps and prisoner-of-war camps in Northern Germany moved into the town. Many of them had been members of the Polish Home Army, men and women, who had fought in the Warsaw Uprising of 1944.

Initially, the new Polish enclave was named Lwów, after the city in South-Eastern Poland by then occupied and later annexed by the Soviet Union under the territory of Ukraine. However, under Soviet pressure, the name was then changed to Maczków, in honour of General Stanislaw Maczek, the commanding officer of the Armoured Division and the local Allied occupation forces. The streets in the town were renamed to Polish, either honouring various military units (Legionów Str., Artyleryjska Str.) or named after streets in Warsaw (Ujazdowskie Avenue).

During the next months, a Polish town with a Polish mayor, a Polish school, a folk high school, a Polish fire brigade and a Polish rectory were established. The latter registered 289 weddings and 101 funerals. 479 Poles have birth certificates showing Maczków as a place of birth. As there were hundreds of thousands of Poles in the area administered by the 1st Armoured Division, "Maczków" also served as a cultural centre: newspapers were being published there on a daily basis (Dziennik and Defilada eventually reaching 90 thousand copies), a theatre was opened (led by Leon Schiller) and concert halls were active. Among the most notable events held in the Polish enclave was a 1947 concert by Benjamin Britten and Lord Yehudi Menuhin.

In the Autumn of 1946, the Polish forces stationed in North-Western Germany started to be demobilised and ferried back to the United Kingdom. Also, the civilian inhabitants started to return to Poland or move to other European states. Eventually, by the end of 1948, the town was returned to the original inhabitants (and renamed back to Haren).

== Geography ==
Haren is located along the River Ems in the central part of Emsland, positioned between Meppen to the south and Papenburg to the north. Neighbouring the Netherlands, Haren has an area of 208.79 square kilometers (80.61 sq mi) and reaches a maximum elevation of 15 meters above sea level.

=== City Structure ===
The city of Haren (Ems) consists of the city centre and the ten localities Altenberge, Emen-Raken, Emmeln, Erika, Fehndorf, Landegge, Lindloh-Schwartenberg, Rütenbrock, Tinnen, and Wesuwe.

=== Hydrography and Wetlands ===
The hydrology of Haren (Ems) is shaped by the River Ems and a network of waterways and wetlands. The area is crossed by two major canals, the Dortmund-Ems Canal, and the Haren-Rütenbrock Canal. West of the town centre lies the Dankernsee, a 40-hectare (99 acre) gravel lake.

The municipality features peatland and wetland habitats and parts of the Nature Park Bourtanger Moor.

== Notable businesses ==
- Berky

== International relations ==
=== Twin towns — Sister cities ===
Haren is twinned with:

- Międzyrzecz, Poland
