= Soil solarization =

Pest control method

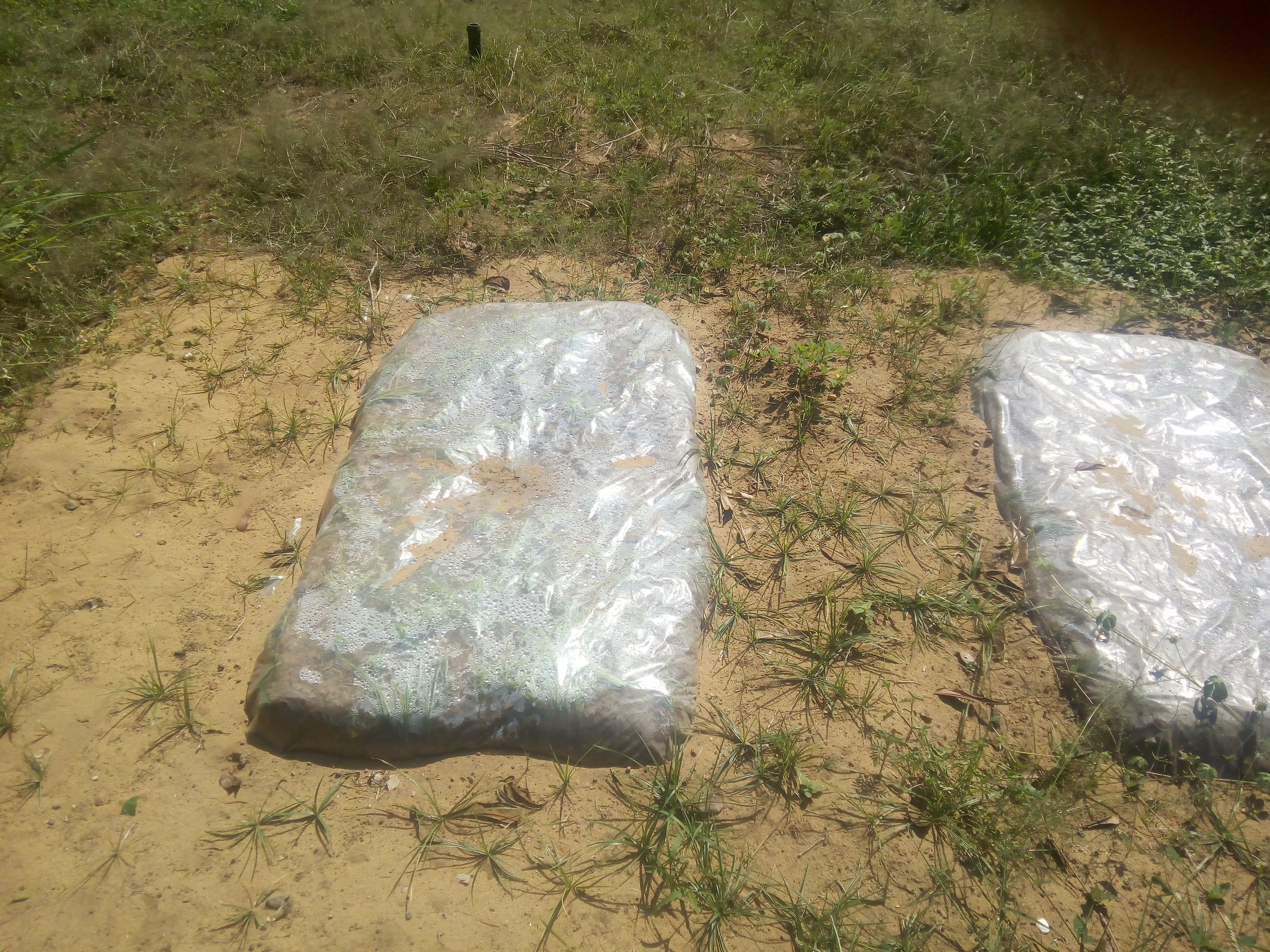
Soil solarization

Soil solarization is a non-chemical environmentally friendly method for controlling pests using solar power to increase the soil temperature to levels at which many soil-borne plant pathogens will be killed or greatly weakened. Soil solarization is used in warm climates on a relatively small scale in gardens and organic farms. Soil solarization weakens and kills fungi, bacteria, nematodes, and insect and mite pests along with weeds in the soil by mulching and covering the soil with a tarp, usually with a transparent polyethylene cover to trap solar energy. This energy causes physical, chemical, and biological changes in the soil community. Soil solarization is dependent upon time, temperature, and soil moisture. It may also be described as a method of decontaminating soil or creating disease suppressive soils by the use of sunlight.

== Soil disinfestation ==
Soil solarization is a hydrothermal process of disinfecting the soil of pests, accomplished by solar power (referred to as solar heating of the soil in early publications) and is relatively a new soil disinfestation method, first described in extensive scientific detail by Katan in 1976. The mode of action for soil solarization is complex and involves the use of heat as a lethal agent for soil pests from the use of transparent polyethylene tarps. To increase the effectiveness of solar heating requires optimal seasonal temperatures, mulching during high temperatures and solar irradiation, and moist soil conditions. Soil temperatures are lower when decreasing in soil depth and it is necessary to continue the mulching process to control for pathogens.

Soil solarization practices require that soil temperatures reach 35-60 degrees Celsius (95 to 140°F), which kills pathogens in the top 30 centimeters of soil. Solarization does not sterilize the soil completely. Soil solarization enhances the soil towards promoting beneficial microorganisms. Soil solarization creates a beneficial microbial community by killing up to 90% of pathogens. More specifically, a study reported after eight days of solarization 100% of Verticillium dahliae (a fungus that causes farm crops to wilt and die) was killed at a depth of 25 centimeters. Soil solarization causes a decrease in beneficial microbes, however beneficial bacteria like Bacillus species are able to survive and flourish under high temperatures in solarized soils. Other studies have also reported an increase in Trichoderma harzianum, a fungus that is also used as a biological fungicide, after solarization. Soil solarization allows for the recolonization of competitive beneficial microbes by creating a favorable environment. The number of beneficial microbes increases over time and makes solarized soils more resistant to pathogens.

The success of solarization is not only due to the decrease in soil pathogens, but also to the increase in beneficial microbes such as Bacillus, Pseudomonas, and Talaromyces flavus. Soil solarization has been shown to suppress soil borne pathogens and cause an increase in plant growth, in particular after organic supplementation. Suppressed soils promote rhizobacteria and have shown to increase total dry weight in sugar beets by 3.5 times. Also the study showed that plant-growth promoting rhizobacteria on sugar beets treated with soil solarization increased root density by 4.7 times. Soil solarization is an important agricultural practice for ecologically friendly soil pathogen suppression, the efficacy of which even overwhelms that of fumigation.

== Soil decontamination ==
A 2008 study used a solar cell to generate an electric field for electrokinetic remediation of cadmium-contaminated soil. The solar cell could drive the electromigration of cadmium in contaminated soil, and the removal efficiency that was achieved by the solar cell was comparable with that achieved by conventional power supply.

In Korea, various remediation methods of soil slurry and groundwater contaminated with benzene at a polluted gas station site were evaluated, including a solar-driven, photocatalyzed reactor system along with various advanced oxidation processes (AOP). The most synergistic remediation method incorporated a solar light process with TiO_{2} slurry and H_{2}O_{2} system, achieving 98% benzene degradation, a substantial increase in the removal of benzene.

== History ==
Soil solarization is the third approach for soil disinfestation. The two other main approaches, soil steaming and fumigation, were developed at the end of the 19th century. In 1939, Grooshevoy, who used the term "solar energy for sand disinfection", controlled Thielaviopsis basicola upon heating the sand by exposure to direct sunlight in Caucasus. The idea of solarization was based on observations by extension workers and farmers in the hot Jordan Valley, who noticed the intensive heating of the polyethylene-mulched soil. The involvement of biological control mechanisms in pathogen control and the possible implications were indicated in the first publication, noticing the very long effect of the treatment. In 1977, American scientists from the University of California at Davis reported the control of Verticillium in a cotton field, based on studies started in 1976, thus denoting, for the first time, the possible wide applicability of this method. The use of solarization in existing orchards (e.g. controlling Verticillium in pistachio plantations) is an important deviation from the standard preplanting method and was reported as early as 1979.

The use of polyethylene for soil solarization differs in principle from its traditional agricultural use. With solarization, soil is mulched during the hottest months (rather than the coldest, as in conventional plasticulture which is aimed at protecting the crop) in order to increase the maximal temperatures in an attempt to achieve lethal heat levels.

In the first 10 years following the influential 1976 publication, soil solarization was investigated in at least 24 countries and 30 years after it has been applied in more than 60 countries, mostly in hot regions, although there were some important exceptions. Studies have demonstrated effectiveness of solarization with various crops, including vegetables, field crops, ornamentals and fruit trees, against many pathogens, weeds and arthropod and nematode pests. However, some pathogens and weeds not or imperfectly controlled by solarization were also detected. Some environmental concerns have been noticed, too, in particular because of the uncontrolled fate of plastic sheets, while biodegradable materials proved to be less effective for weed control, and the often reported (inherent to the method) reduction of microbial richness.

Computerized simulation models have been developed to guide researchers and growers whether the ambient conditions of their locality are suitable for solarization.

Studies were also carried out of the improvement of solarization by integrating it with other methods, by solarizing in closed glasshouses, and by developing mulching machines.
