= Aquamog =

Machine for removing weeds on lakes

An aquamog is a machine for removing weeds growing over a body of water. It is an aquatic vessel that can remove weeds that float on the water's surface and can block up waterways. It also scoops up surface level algae on bodies of water. It has a long, extendable, arm attached to the operators cabin, attached to a solid base that can traverse many water conditions. An aquamog was used in 2018 for removing water primrose from North Lake in San Francisco's Golden Gate Park. A newspaper photo shows a machine similar to a backhoe on very wide crawlers.

Aquatic Environments, a Concord, California contractor, used an aquamog to scoop up muck at the Palace of Fine Arts lagoon, in a project expected to take 26 days.

== History and Creation ==
The aquamog was invented in the beginning of the 1980s by the aforementioned Aquatic Environments (AU) company. Jim Nevrela, an engineer on the project, chose the name aquamog from the multi-purpose vehicle Unimog produced by Mercedes-Benz. The first model of the aquamog was created from an aquatic weed harvester, as a trial to see if the concept could function mechanically and for its desired purpose.

== See also ==
- Aquatic weed harvester
