= Aquatic weed harvester =

Boat designed for cutting aqautic weeds

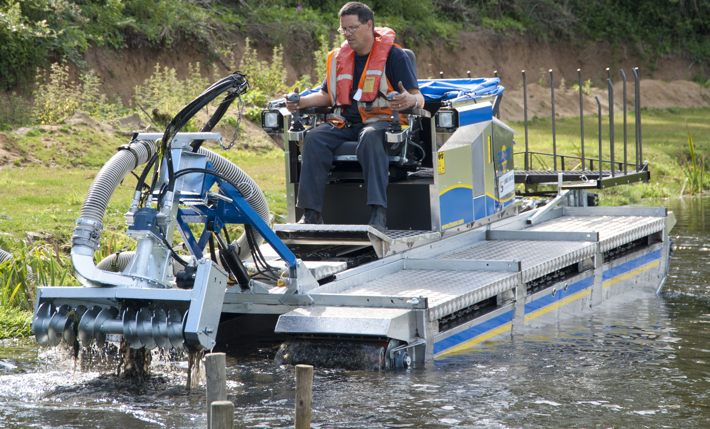
Truxor in action on a freshwater lake

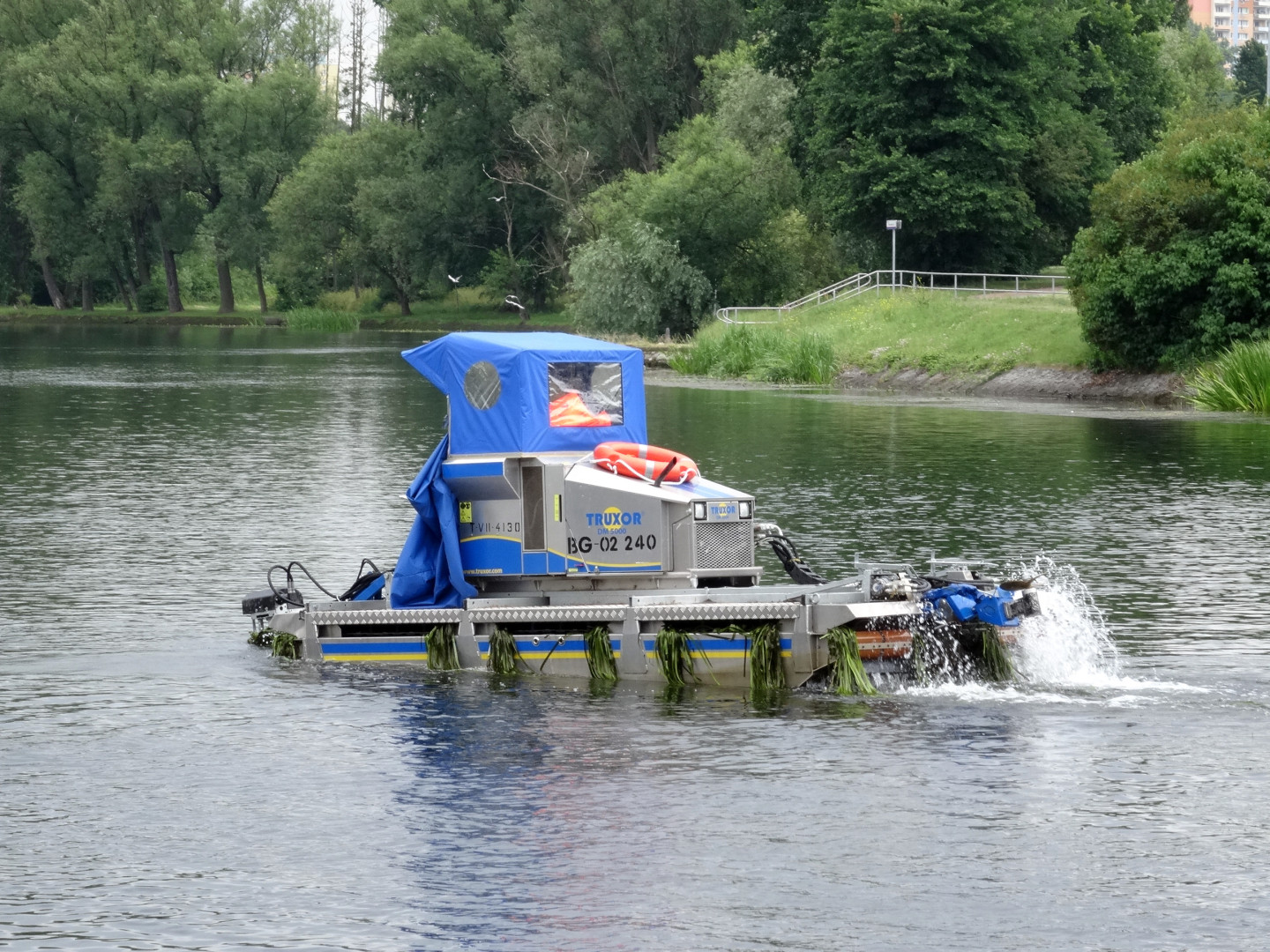

An aquatic weed harvester, also known as a water mower, mowing boat and weed cutting boat, is an aquatic machine specifically designed for inland watercourse management to cut and harvest underwater weeds, reeds and other aquatic plant life. The action of removing aquatic plant life in such a manner has been referred to as "aquatic harvesting".

== Overview ==
Water is an important resource and in many countries, waterways are increasingly clogged by aquatic plant growth. This is particularly so in tropical countries where warmer water means the plants grow more quickly, and increasing run-off of fertilisers and effluent has exacerbated the problem. Irrigation ditches and pumps can become overgrown with vegetation, power station and factory water intakes can get blocked, boats can get hindered, fish stocks can be disrupted, and water moves more slowly, resulting in greater evapotranspiration and a greater risk of flooding. In some large irrigation projects in India, canals have become so overgrown with vegetation that water flow has been reduced to a fifth of its previous amount. In Bangladesh, floodwater has washed mats of water hyacinth onto paddy fields, overwhelming the emerging rice crops. Small fish can become entangled in excessive algal growth.

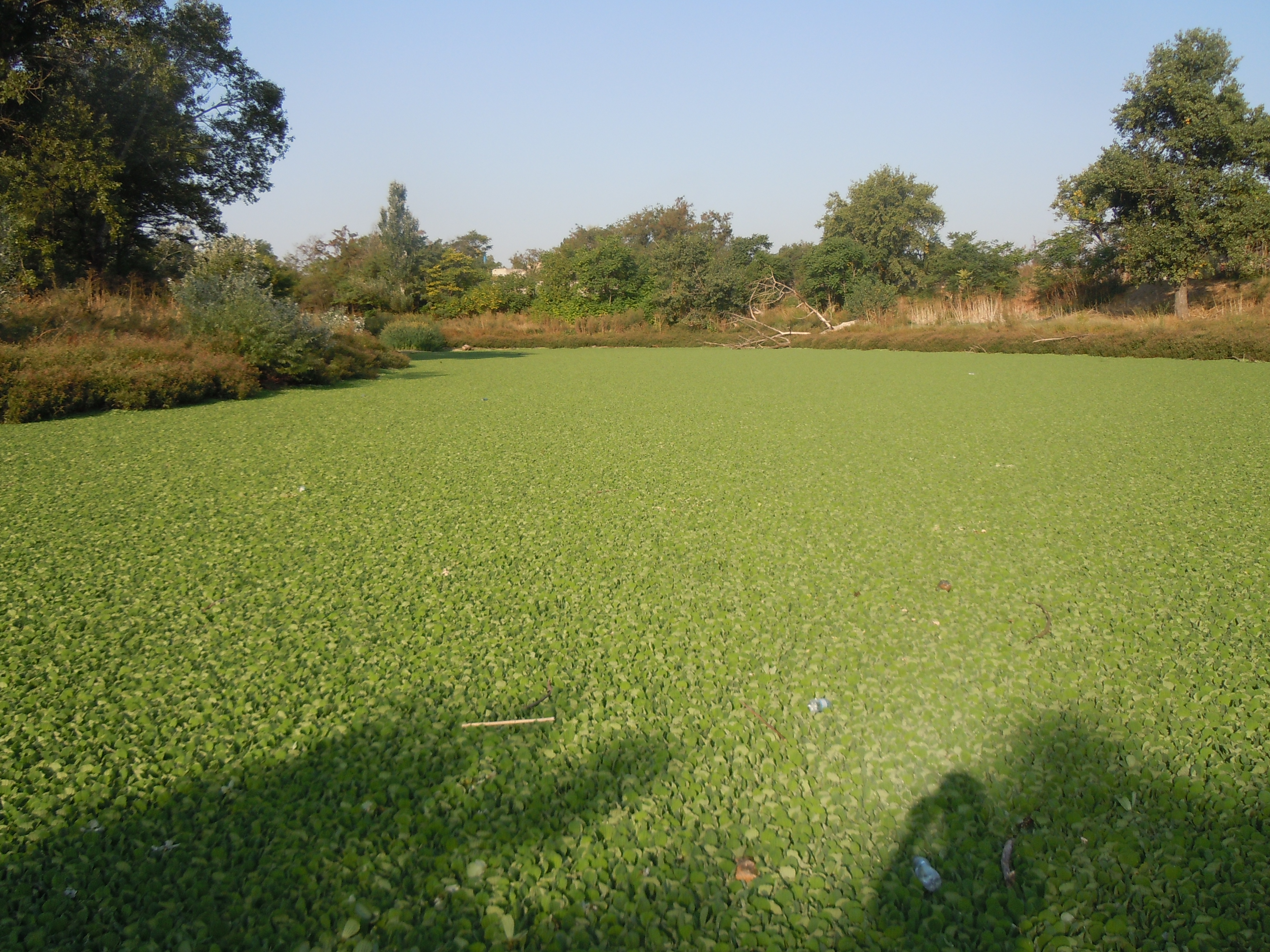
Water lettuce (Pistia stratiotes) in Odesa, Ukraine

Rice is the main aquatic plant grown for human food, but smaller areas of watercress and water chestnut are also cultivated. In their native environments, aquatic weeds are part of a balanced ecosystem, and it is mainly introduced species of water plant that become invasive and cause problems by congesting water bodies. The worst culprits, found in both temperate and tropical waterways, are floating plants such as water hyacinth, water lettuce and Salvinia, fully submerged rooting plants such as Hydrilla and water milfoil and rooting plants that reach the surface such as cattail, papyrus, bulrush and reed.

== Weed harvesting equipment ==
Weed cutting boats are developed to enable the maintenance of canals, lakes and rivers and to remove excessive aquatic life such as algae and other plants that may negatively affect a waterway's ecology. Mechanical harvesters are large floating machines that have underwater cutting blades that sever the stems of underwater plants, gather the weeds and raise them on conveyor belts, storing the vegetation on board in a hold. Periodically this is discharged to a barge or an onshore facility. The harvested product can be composted, sent to a landfill site or used in land reclamation. In developing countries aquatic vegetation may be harvested by hand or by net from the shore, cut and harvested by boat and lifted ashore by hand, crane, pump or conveyor system. The harvested vegetation may be used for the feeding of livestock. To reduce the high moisture content and to make it easier to transport, the weed can be chopped and pressed. Other uses to which the harvested vegetation can be put include ensiling the material for livestock fodder, adding it to the soil as a bulky organic fertilizer, manufacturing the raw material into pulp, paper or fibre, and fermenting it to produce methane for energy production.

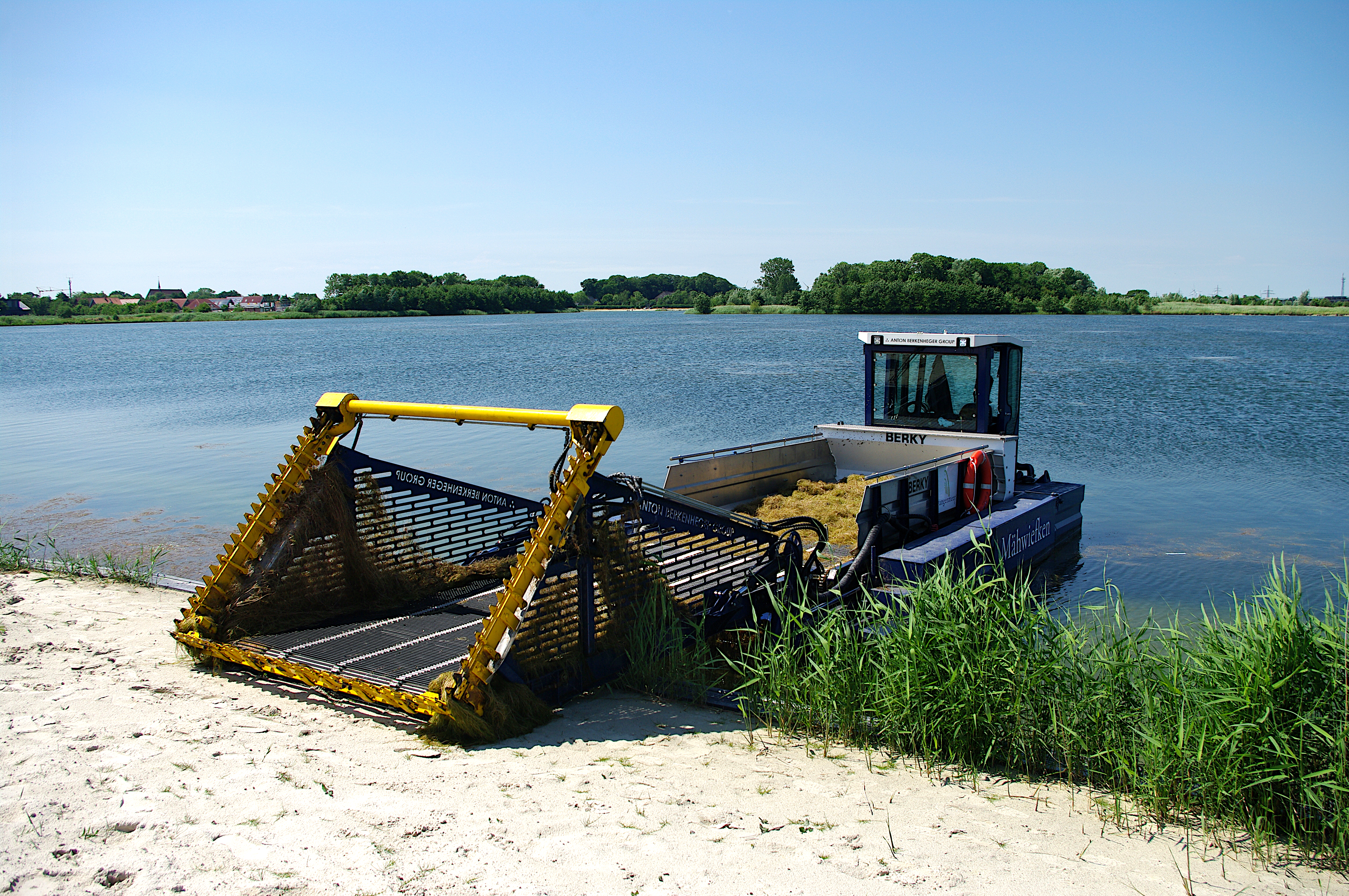
Made by the German manufacturer Berky, with a conveyor belt and cutting unit

== Advantages and disadvantages ==
Mechanical weed harvesters are effective at clearing aquatic weeds and the machines provide immediate relief from nuisance vegetation that interfere with navigation and recreation. Aquatic plants contain nitrogen, phosphorus and potassium that is bound in the vegetation, by removing the plants the nutrients are also removed. Removal of the biomass (plant material) prevents the build-up of muck and sediment on the bottom of the lake that occurs from the rotting weeds. Mechanical harvesters can also be used to improve the fishery by leaving behind aquatic vegetation for food and habitat. Aquatic weed machines are expensive and require a capital investment and the process may need to be repeated several times in a growing season. Small fragments of weed may remain in the water and may spread to other locations thereby aiding in the dispersal of invasive species. However, a recent study by the Chautauqua Lake Association found that the harvesters left less than 1% of the loose plants behind. Some areas may be too shallow for the mechanical harvester and it may be unable to access restricted locations. Submerged tree stumps can damage the machine. Aquatic weeds can also be utilized as a source of biofuel.

An alternative to mechanical harvesting is the use of herbicides, which are easy to apply and less expensive, but may have unwanted adverse impacts on the environment. While many aquatic herbicides have received EPA approval and are considered safe for aquatic environments, long-term studies have found that aquatic herbicides can have major impacts on fish reproduction. Researchers at the University of Wisconsin-Madison found that fathead minnows exposed to concentrations of fluridone showed signs of endocrine disruption.

== By region ==
=== Africa ===
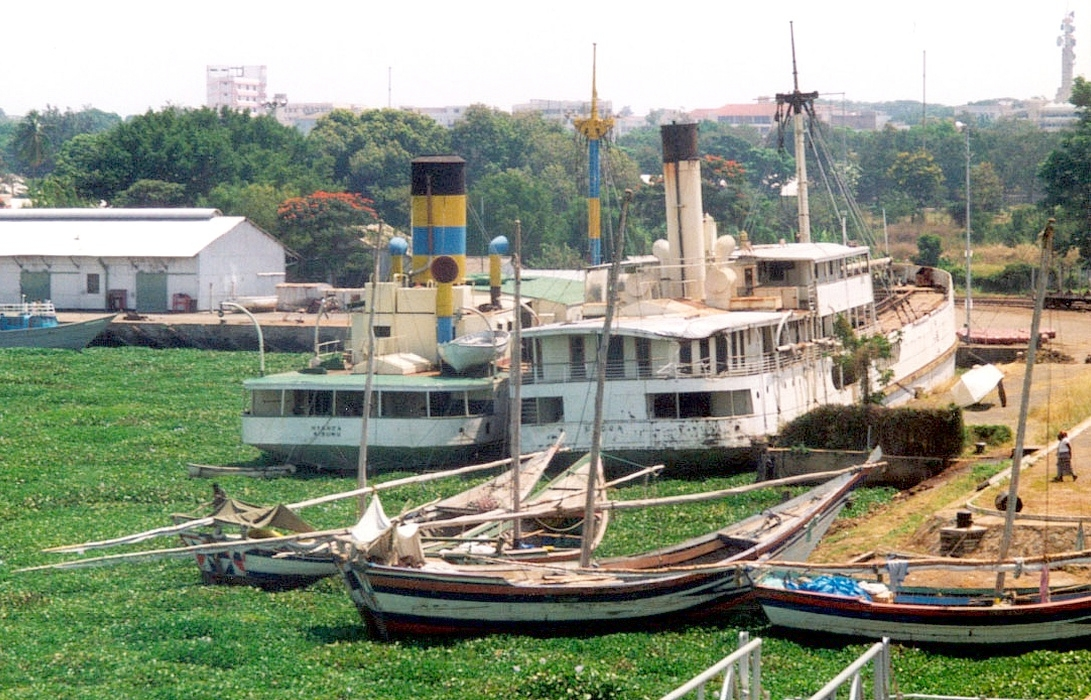
Water hyacinth growing in Lake Victoria at Kisumu

In June 2015 in Uganda, use of the aquatic weed harvester was recommended by the country's Ministry of Agriculture to reduce water hyacinth growth in Lake Victoria, which has caused a scarcity of fish in the lake. The scarcity of fish has negatively-affected the livelihood of locals who live in the lake's region. Additional types of machines were recommended to address the problem, which were the hydraulic harvester, take out elevator and dredger.

=== India ===
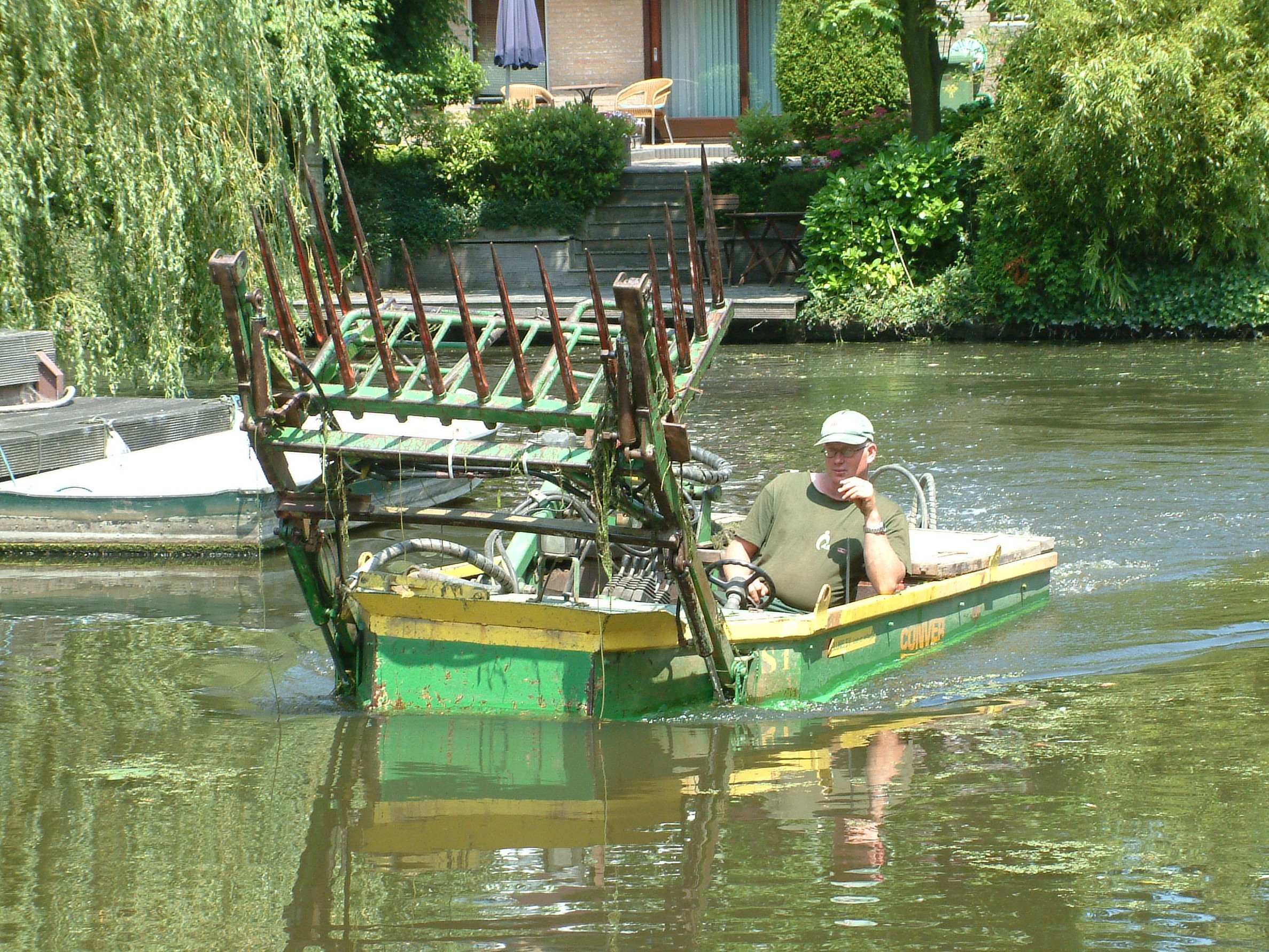
A mowing boat

In August 2015 in Hyderabad, India, an aquatic weed harvester was used to remove algal weeds and trash from Hussainsagar Lake. An amphibious hydraulic excavator was also used. The work was performed to address pollution problems at the lake, which had accumulated significant algae and rubbish such as plastic bags and plastic waste, food wrappers, and various garbage, some of which was floating atop the lake.

=== United States ===
Some U.S. companies manufacture aquatic weed harvesters. One such machine manufactured by a U.S. company can cut around one-half an acre of weeds a day, and costs over $100,000.

Tampa, Florida used an aquatic weed harvester in 2013 to clear aquatic plant life from lakes in the area.

In 2012 in Leoni, Michigan, an aquatic weed harvester was used to remove algae from Center Lake. The algae appeared to have roots, and other techniques such as attempting to kill it with chemicals were unsuccessful. The machine used collects algae and weeds that live at the bottom of the lake, removing them from the waterway.

== See also ==
- Aquamog
- Mechanical weed control
- Eichhornia crassipes § Uses
- List of agricultural machinery
- Water resource management
