= Glossary of agriculture =

List of definitions of terms and concepts commonly used in agriculture

This glossary of agriculture is a list of definitions of terms and concepts used in agriculture, its sub-disciplines, and related fields, including horticulture, animal husbandry, agribusiness, and agricultural policy. For other glossaries relevant to agricultural science, see Glossary of biology, Glossary of ecology, Glossary of environmental science, and Glossary of botanical terms.

== A ==
abattoir
See slaughterhouse.
aboiteau

A sluice or conduit built beneath a coastal dike, with a hinged gate or a one-way valve that closes during high tide but remains open during low tide, preventing salt water from flowing into the sluice and flooding the land behind the dike while allowing fresh water precipitation and irrigation runoff to drain from the land into the sea. The term may also refer to a method of land reclamation which relies on these gated sluices to convert tidal flats and coastal marshes into land suitable for agriculture. Aboiteau systems are usually installed several seasons prior to planting to allow time for natural flows of fresh water to drain through the soil and reduce its salinity. This method is practiced in areas with extremely high tidal amplitudes, particularly Atlantic Canada, where large tracts of coastal land would otherwise be rendered useless by regular tidal inundation.
acaricide
A pesticide intended to kill or incapacitate members of the arthropod subclass Acari, which includes ticks and mites, either by targeting adults or by preventing the growth and development of their eggs or larvae. Acaricides specifically helpful against ticks may also be known as ixodicides and those specific to mites may be known as miticides. Though ticks and mites are not technically insects, in common usage, acaricides are sometimes referred to as insecticides.
acre (ac)
A unit of area traditionally defined as the area of one chain (66 feet) by one furlong (660 feet), equivalent to 43,560 square feet (0.001563 sq mi; 4,047 m^{2}), or about 0.40 hectare.
acreage
A quantity of land; several acres considered collectively, united by their ownership, management, usage, geographical location, or some other unifying feature.
acre-foot
A customary unit of volume defined as the volume of one acre of surface area to a depth of one foot, commonly used in the United States about large-scale water or soil resources. One acre-foot is equal to 43,560 cubic feet (1,233 m^{3}).
adjuvant
A chemical compound added to a pesticide formulation to increase its efficacy or safety.
aerial seeding
A type of broadcast seeding in which large quantities of seed are dropped from aircraft flying over crop fields. Aircraft can be useful for quickly seeding vast expanses of land or wherever the terrain makes conventional ground-based seeding methods difficult or impractical, e.g., in marshy or flooded areas, where they are commonly used for sowing rice paddies.
aeroponics
The cultivation of plants with the roots suspended in an air or mist environment rather than in soil or a solid aggregate medium, usually inside a closed or partially closed chamber where the properties of the air can be easily controlled. Plants are typically supported by the chamber itself or with foam supports or trellises. Sometimes, only the roots are inside the growth chamber; stems, leaves, flowers, and fruits may or may not be. The primary benefits of aeroponics are increased gas exchange in the root zone and reduced access by pests and pathogens borne by solid or liquid growth media. It is often practiced in research contexts. Aeroponics is sometimes considered a subclass of hydroponics since water is still delivered to the plant via atomized droplets from a mist sprayer. However, unlike conventional hydroponics, the roots are not continuously suspended in flowing water.
agrarian system
The dynamic set of economic and technological factors that affect agricultural practices in a particular region.
agrarianism
A social or political philosophy that values rural society as superior to urban society and the independent farmer as superior to the paid worker. Agrarianism argues in favor of farming as a way of life that can shape ideal social values.
agribusiness
The business of agricultural production, including the entire range of activities and disciplines encompassed by modern food and fiber production chains and those agents and institutions that influence them.
agricultural aircraft
agricultural cooperative

Any association of farmers or agricultural businesses who voluntarily pool their resources to meet their common agricultural needs and goals by cooperating in a jointly owned enterprise. Agricultural cooperatives may be distinguished between "service" cooperatives, which provide inputs for agricultural production (seeds, fertilizers, fuels, etc.) or transportation and marketing services to members who run their farms individually, and "production" cooperatives, in which members run their farms jointly using shared land, machinery, or other resources; an example of the latter is collective farming.
agricultural cycle
The annual or seasonal cycle of activities related to the production of a particular agricultural product, especially the growth and harvest of plant crops, inclusive of all steps normally involved in the complete process from initial preparations (e.g. tilling, sowing, fertilizing, and irrigating) through sale and distribution of the finished product (e.g. harvesting, storage, packing, and marketing).
agricultural economics
A branch of economics concerned with the application of economic theory in optimizing the production and distribution of food, fiber, and other products of agriculture.
agricultural engineering
A branch of engineering concerned with agricultural production and processing. It combines elements of mechanical engineering, civil engineering, chemical engineering, and food science, among other disciplines.
agricultural extension
The application of new knowledge and techniques obtained through scientific research to agricultural practices by educating farmers and agricultural communities, with the goals of improving the efficiency and productivity of agriculture, improving living standards in rural areas, and raising awareness of environmental issues. The term encompasses a variety of educational and outreach activities organized by professional educators from a wide range of disciplines, often with an emphasis on agricultural marketing, land management, sustainability, food safety, and public health.
agricultural fencing
Any fence or barrier used to keep domestic or wild animals (or humans) inside or outside of an agricultural area. Fencing materials and designs vary widely depending on terrain and the kinds of animals they are intended to deter, though wooden logs, barbed wire, and electrified fences are common. They must often be continuous for long distances to surround farms or pastures. In many places, ranchers are required by law to build fences to enclose their grazing livestock within designated rangeland; in others, livestock are allowed to roam freely, and responsibility for fencing belongs to those who wish to prevent animals from accessing their land.
agricultural land
Any land devoted solely to agriculture, i.e., the deliberate and systematic reproduction of living organisms to produce commodities that humans can use. In the broadest sense, agricultural land may also include certain types used only partially or seasonally for agricultural purposes, such as pastures and wild forests. Colloquially, the term is often used interchangeably with farmland, cropland, and arable land, though these terms may also be considered technically distinct.
agricultural machinery
The mechanical or electrical tools, devices, and structures used in farming or any other type of agriculture. The broadest definition includes handheld power tools, but in general usage the term implies huge motorized machines, particularly tractors and the many types of farm implements which they tow and/or supply power to. The mechanization of agricultural tasks is a defining element of industrial agriculture.
agricultural productivity
A measure of the economic productivity of a given quantity of agricultural land (or any other agricultural input), typically expressed as the ratio of outputs to inputs. In modern agricultural industries, "output" is often quantified as the market value of the agricultural product at the end of the production chain (i.e., immediately before its purchase by a consumer).
agricultural recession
A period of economic recession for an agricultural industry, characterized chiefly by low crop prices and/or low incomes for farming operations.
agricultural science

The application of scientific methods to agriculture, or the study of agriculture as a scientific discipline. It is a multidisciplinary field encompassing all elements of the natural, economic, and social sciences which are used in the practice and understanding of agriculture. A professional in this field may be called an agricultural scientist or agriculturist.
agriculture
The science and art of cultivating plants, animals, or other living organisms in order to produce any of a variety of products that can be used by humans, most commonly food, fibers, fuels, and raw materials.
agriculturist

A professional in the science, practice, and management of agriculture and agribusiness.
agritourism
Any primarily agricultural operation or activity that brings visitors to a farm or ranch, either for direct-to-consumer sales (e.g. farm stands and "You-Pick" operations), education, hospitality, recreation, or entertainment.
agrivoltaics
The simultaneous use of land area for both solar energy production and agriculture, by installing solar panels in the same spaces where crops are grown or animals are raised.

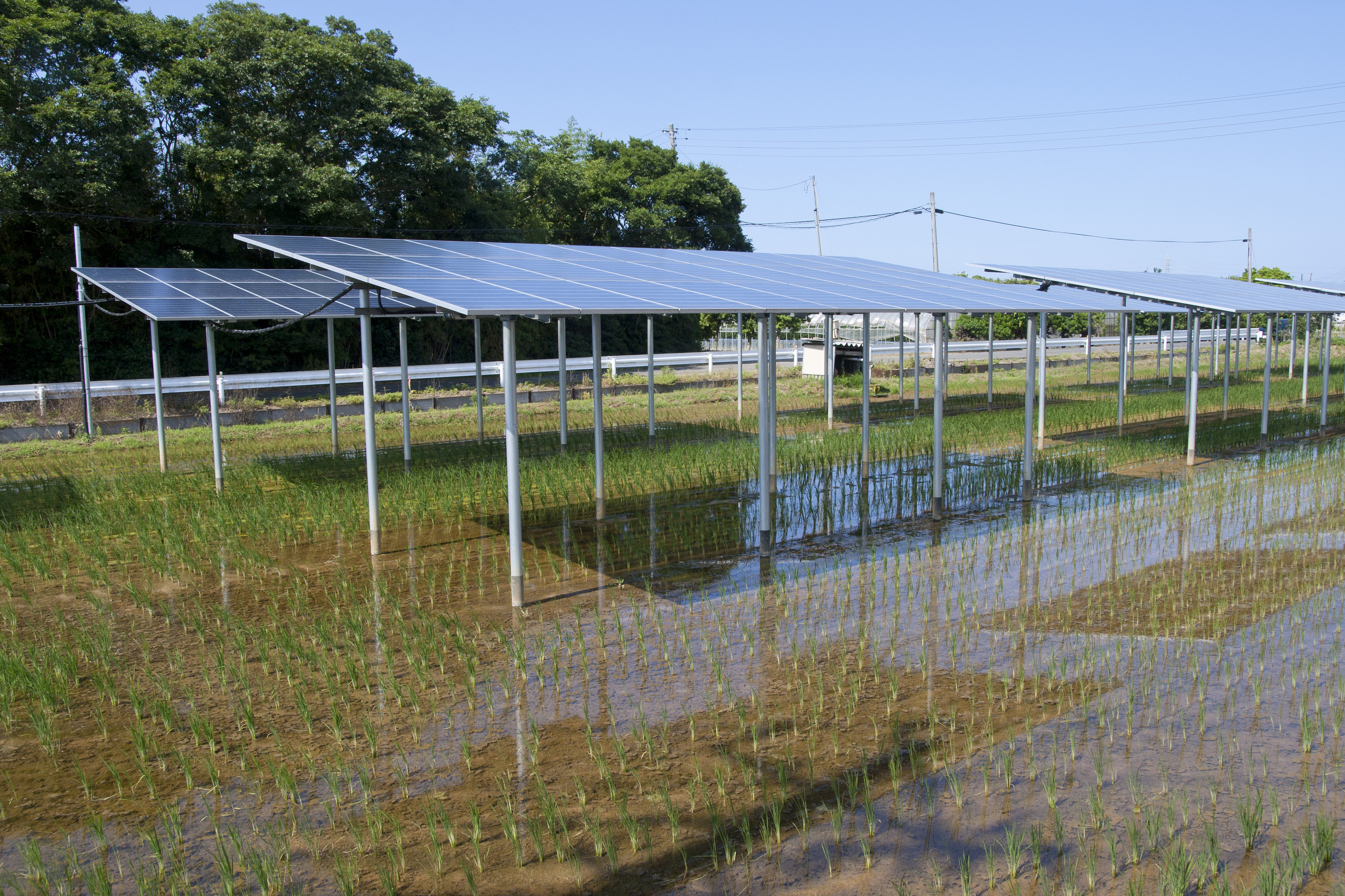
Solar panels above paddy fields in Japan, an example of agrivoltaics

agrobiology
The study of plant nutrition and growth, especially as a means of increasing crop yield.
agroecology
The study of ecology as it pertains to agriculture, particularly the application of knowledge about ecological processes to agricultural production systems.
agroecosystem
An ecosystem that supports an agricultural production system, such as in a farm or garden; the network of ecological interactions that influences and is influenced by the human practice of agriculture. Agroecosystems are the basic unit of study in agroecology.
agroforestry
The combination of the knowledge and practices of agriculture and forestry, resulting in a system of land use in which forest trees or shrubs are grown around or among agricultural crops or pastureland, with the goal of enhancing the functionality and sustainability of a farming system. Agroforestry shares principles with intercropping but may involve complex ecological interactions between hundreds of species.
agrology
The branch of soil science concerning the agricultural production of crop plants. The term is often used interchangeably with agronomy, agricultural science, and agricultural soil science.
agronomy
The science and technology of producing and using plants for food, fuel, fiber, and land restoration.
algaculture
A specialized branch of aquaculture involving the cultivation of algae, with the goal of producing any of a variety of products that can be used by humans, including food ingredients, fertilizers, colorants and dyes, pharmaceuticals, and chemical feedstock.
alley cropping
An agroforestry technique in which annual field crops are grown in the open "alleys" between widely spaced rows of planted trees. Many different species have been cultivated in these systems but the cash crops are usually staples such as wheat, corn, soybeans, and hay, while the trees are commonly large hardwood fruit and nut trees such as walnut, pecan, persimmon, and willow; trees that harbor nitrogen-fixing microorganisms or that have deep taproots capable of drawing large quantities of nutrients to the soil surface are especially valuable. Alley cropping is popular as a form of sustainable and value-added polyculture, where the presence of trees confers many benefits normally absent from traditional open fields, including improved nutrition and moisture retention, shade, and protection from extreme weather. Trees may also yield useful produce, fuelwood, or fodder in their own right, potentially allowing farmers to diversify their sources of income.
ammonium nitrate
animal engine
Any machine powered by an animal. Domestic animals, especially horses, mules, donkeys, oxen, and dogs, have frequently been trained by humans to provide power for various agricultural machinery and operations such as ploughing and milling.
animal feed
See fodder.
animal unit
A standard measure, based on feed requirements, used to combine various classes of livestock according to size, weight, age, and intended use. On federal lands in the United States, one animal unit represents one mature cow, bull, steer, heifer, horse, or mule, or five sheep or goats, all over six months of age.
animal-free agriculture

Any agricultural practice or farming method that does not make use of animals or animal products, such as farmed animal manures. Animal-free agriculture may use organic or non-organic techniques.
apiculture

The maintenance of colonies of bees, commonly in human-made beehives, by humans for any of a variety of purposes, including collecting honey or other products created by bees, pollinating crops, and breeding bees for sale. A location where bees are kept is called an apiary and a person who practices apiculture is called an apiarist or beekeeper.
aquaculture

The cultivation of aquatic organisms in either freshwater or saltwater habitats, including fish, crustaceans, molluscs, aquatic plants, and others, with the goal of producing any of a variety of products that can be used by humans. Branches of aquaculture include pisciculture, algaculture, and mariculture.
aquaponics
A variant of hydroponic agriculture that recycles nutrient-rich waters sourced from an aquaculture operation and uses them to feed hydroponically grown plants.
arable land
Any land which is capable of producing viable agricultural crops in its present state, and which does not require substantial clearing or other improvements apart from routine tillage operations. This may include both natural, unaltered landscapes that are fertile enough to immediately support agriculture, as well as land that has been made arable by previous modification and cultivation. Colloquially, the term is often used interchangeably with farmland, cropland, and agricultural land, though these terms may also be considered technically distinct.
arboricide
1. A pesticide intended to kill trees, shrubs, or other woody plants. See also herbicide.
2. The intentional or unintentional killing of trees.
artificial daylight supplementation
artificial selection

The process by which humans use animal breeding and plant breeding to selectively control the development of particular phenotypic traits in organisms by choosing which individual organisms will reproduce and create offspring. Artificial selection involves the deliberate exploitation of knowledge about genetics and reproductive biology in the hope of producing desirable characteristics in descendant organisms. It is widely practiced in agriculture, but it may also be unintentional and may produce unintended results.
assarting
The act of clearing forested land in order to prepare it for agriculture or other purposes.

== B ==
backfat
The fat covering the back of a live animal or a carcass, especially beef cattle. The amount of backfat on an animal is often used as a metric for estimating yield before it is slaughtered.
backgrounding
The preparation of young cattle for living in a feedlot by getting them accustomed to confinement facilities and processed feed.
bale
1. A large cylindrical or rectangular bundle of compressed hay, straw, cotton, wool, or other plant or animal fibers which have been compacted and bound together by twine, wire, netting, or plastic wrap for easy movement and handling. Bales are usually made by machines known as balers.
2. A unit of measurement of hay, equal to 10 flakes or approximately 70–90 pounds (32–41 kilograms).
baler

A large farm machine used to cut and compress raked crops, commonly hay, cotton, and silage, into compact bales that are easier to handle, transport, and store. Balers may be towed by or mounted upon a tractor, or they may be self-propelled; they can produce bales of various shapes and sizes, variously bound with twine, strapping, netting, or baling wire.
bale wrapper
A tractor-drawn implement which automates the action of completely surrounding bales of hay with plastic, triggering the natural anoxic fermentation that turns hay into silage.
barbed wire

A type of agricultural fencing consisting of two to five metal rungs or strands, each made from paired steel wires twisted together, with sharp, pointed, nail-like barbs attached at regular intervals. The barbs are intended to poke or scratch livestock and wild animals, discouraging them from climbing or destroying the fence. Barbed wire is widely popular on rangeland and in many other contexts because it is much cheaper and easier to erect than alternative types of fencing.

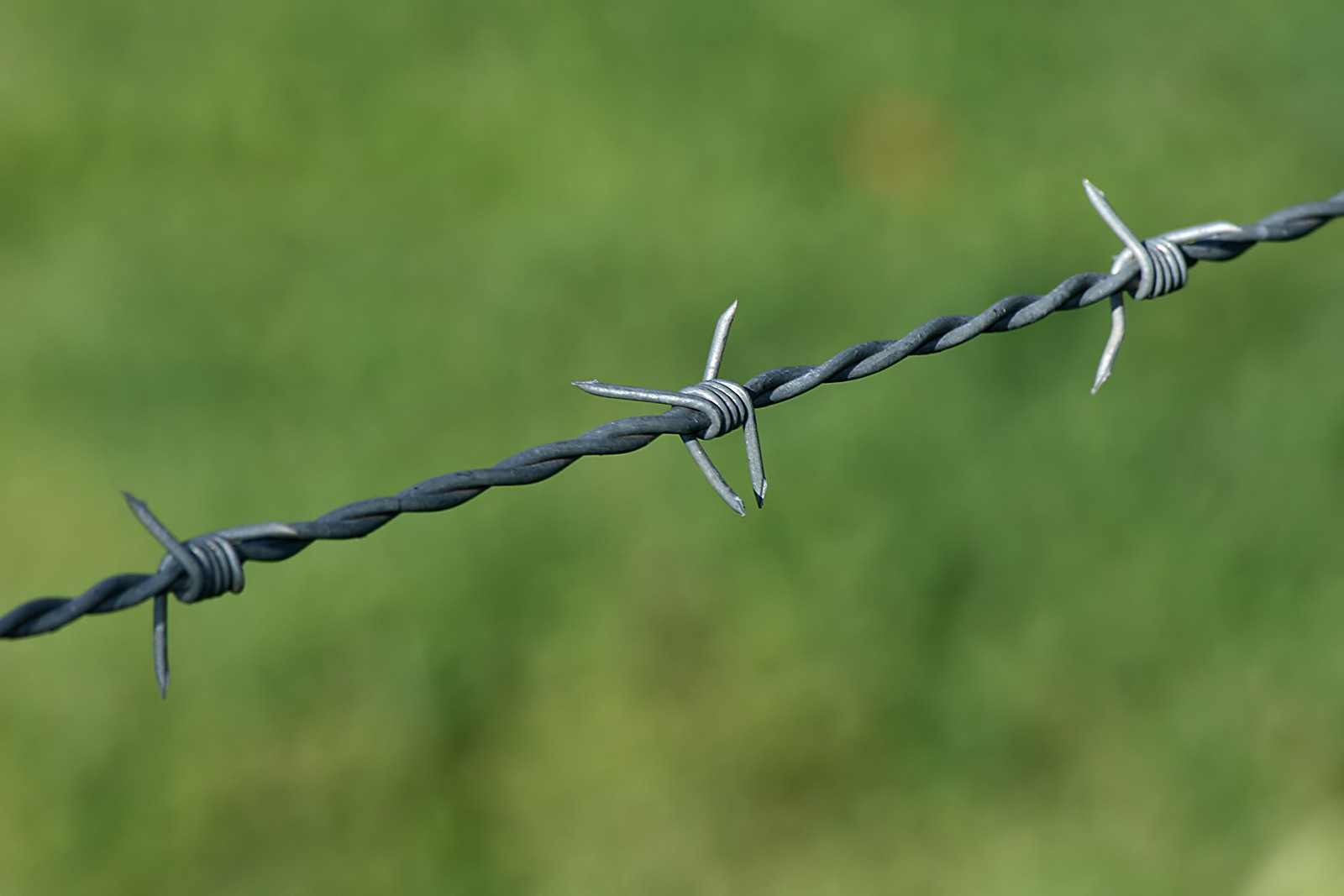
Close-up of a typical strand of barbed wire

barn
A large agricultural building serving any of a wide variety of purposes, especially as storage space for hay, grain, harvested crops, animal feed, or farm equipment, or as a shelter to house livestock.
barnyard
A fenced-in lot or pen adjacent to a barn, used especially to enclose livestock.
barrow
A young male domestic pig that has been castrated.
bearing acres
Agricultural land or acreage on which plants are being cultivated and are of sufficient maturity to produce a commercially viable crop (even if they are not yet producing at their full capacity).
beaverslide
A device used to build very large stacks of loose, unbaled hay to be stored in place in a field, consisting of an inclined plane up which a load of hay is pushed by a pulley-operated platform or basket, as much as 30 feet (9.1 m) in height, in order to be dropped through a large gap to the ground; successive loads are piled on top of each other and allowed to compress naturally under their own weight. The resulting haystacks, which can weigh up to 20 tons, are weatherproof and can be left in the open for multiple seasons. Beaverslides were once widely used in the northwestern United States.
beef cattle
Cattle bred or raised specifically for their meat, known as beef, in contrast to cattle raised for other purposes, such as for their milk or so that they can be employed as working animals.
beefalo

A hybrid offspring of domestic cattle (Bos taurus) and the American bison (Bison bison); when intentional, usually obtained by crossing a male bovine with a female bison.
beekeeping
See apiculture.
biennial bearing
Describing a perennial crop that alternates from year to year between extremely productive growing seasons with very high yields and extremely unproductive growing seasons where yields are relatively low and harvests are small. Many fruit trees, including apples, pears, mangoes, and apricots, as well as coffee, bear flowers and fruits that exhibit this irregular production.
billy goat
See buck.
bin burn
The discoloration and deterioration of harvested grain due to heat during long-term storage in bins.
biochar
A fine-grained, porous charcoal produced from organic matter via pyrolysis (i.e. in low-temperature, anoxic conditions) rather than standard combustion. It is often used as a soil amendment to increase soil fertility and sequester carbon.
biodynamic agriculture
A type of alternative agriculture which incorporates holistic ecological approaches and aspects of organic and integrated farming but also emphasizes various esoteric perspectives, including spiritual and mystical beliefs about nature. The efficacy of biodynamic agricultural techniques lacks scientific evidence, and the practice has been labeled a pseudoscience.
bioeffector
Any viable microorganism or naturally occurring chemical compound which directly or indirectly affects plant growth, development, production, and/or yield quality (e.g. organic fertilizers and biofertilizers) and thus has the potential to reduce or replace use of conventional chemical fertilizers or pesticides.
biofertilizer
A substance containing living microorganisms such as bacteria and algae which, when applied to seeds, plant parts, or soil, colonize plant tissues or the rhizosphere surrounding the roots and promote the growth and health of the host plant by increasing the supply or bioavailability of useful nutrients. Biofertilizers serve the same purpose as conventional fertilizers, though instead of delivering nutrients directly to plants they work indirectly by stimulating natural processes (e.g. fixing nitrogen and solubilizing phosphorus) which cause essential nutrients or other growth-promoting substances to accumulate in the local microenvironment; nearby plant tissues can then uptake these nutrients for themselves. The presence of symbiotic microorganisms can improve soil fertility and increase soil organic matter, making them a sustainable alternative to the application of synthetic fertilizers and other agrichemicals.
biofortification
The selective breeding or genetic engineering of edible plant crops with the goal of increasing their nutritional value. Though many foods are chemically fortified or enriched with micronutrient additives such as iron and vitamin D during post-harvest processing, biofortification instead attempts to cultivate plant varieties which naturally produce high concentrations of these nutrients while growing, such that the resulting crops already contain high concentrations at the time of harvest.
biofuel
Any fuel produced from recently living biomass, as opposed to fuels produced by slow geological processes such as fossil fuels. Biofuels such as bioethanol and biodiesel are commonly produced from agricultural energy crops.
bioinoculant
See soil inoculant.
biological farming
See organic farming.
biological pest control

A method of controlling agricultural pests such as insects, mites, weeds, or microbial pathogens that relies on predation, herbivory, or parasitism by other organisms, or any other naturally occurring biological phenomenon. It is often a component of integrated pest management programs.
biosaline agriculture
biosolarization
A variant of soil solarization in which compost or organic amendments are added to the soil before it is covered with transparent plastic, which can promote increased microbial activity and thereby contribute to small but significant increases in soil temperature, potentially speeding up and improving the efficiency of the solarization process.
bioturbation
The mixing and turning of soil caused by organisms moving through the soil.
blood meal
A byproduct made from the fresh blood of slaughtered animals, commonly used as an organic fertilizer for cultivated plants. It is rich in crude protein and amino acids.
boar
An adult male hog of breeding age.
board foot (FBM)

A unit of volume of lumber, defined as the volume of a board or plank of wood that is one foot long, one foot wide, and one inch thick, i.e. 12 in × 12 in × 1 in (305 mm × 305 mm × 25.4 mm), which is equivalent to 1/12 of a cubic foot (ft^{3}), 144 in^{3}, or 2,360 cm^{3}. The board foot is used to measure rough lumber (before drying and planing) as well as planed lumber.
bobby calf
A young bovine calf of either sex which is designated to be slaughtered for its meat. See also vealer.
boll
The rounded seed pod of cotton or flax plants, inside of which the seeds are embedded within a cushion of valuable natural fibers.

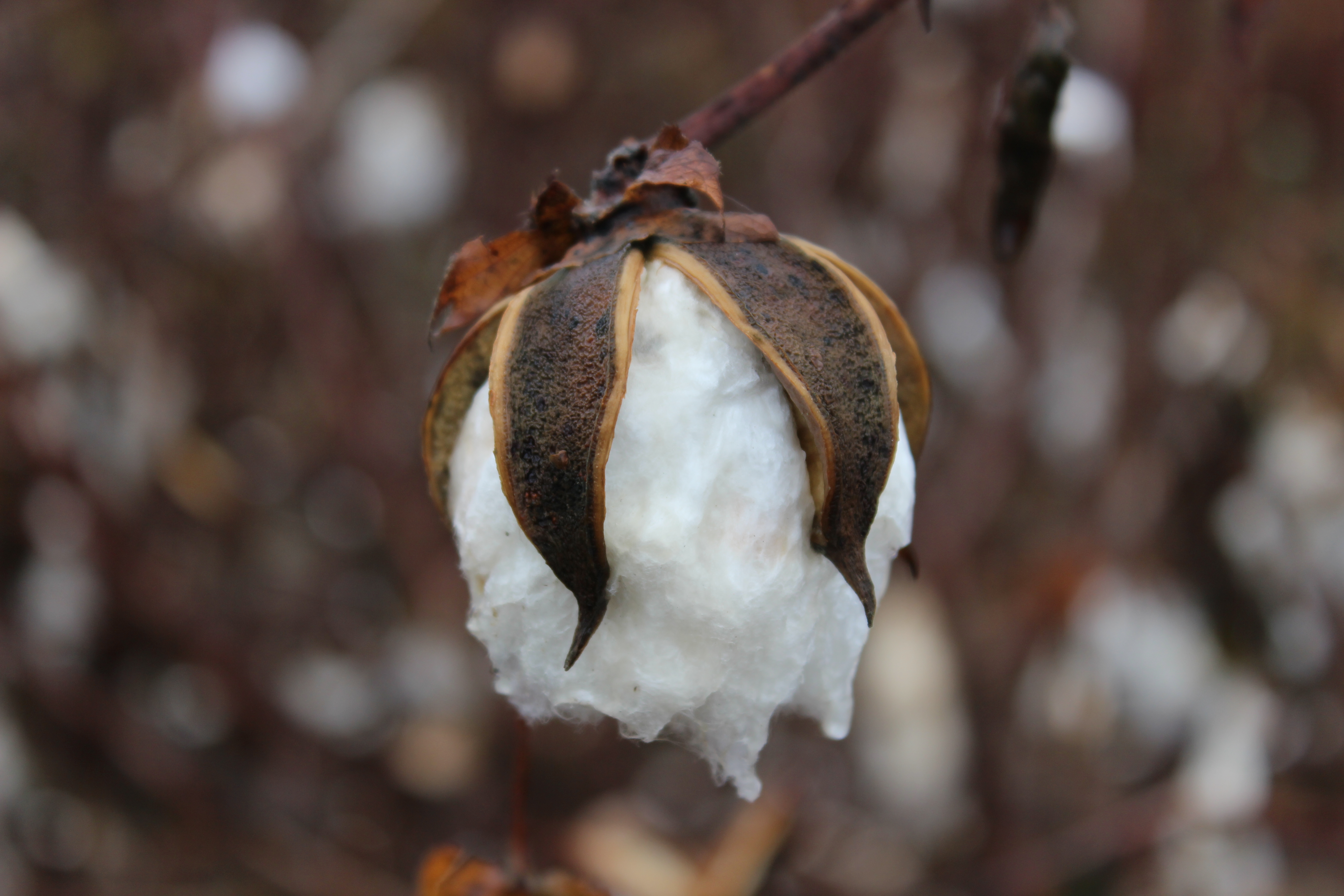
A boll on a cotton plant, nearly ready for harvest

bolting
The process by which certain crops cultivated for their leaves or roots produce flowers or other reproductive parts prematurely, before the crop is intended to be harvested, in an attempt to reproduce sexually and generate seeds. This necessarily diverts resources away from its edible or usable non-reproductive parts, which can negatively impact their flavor and texture and the quality of the harvest in general. The phenomenon is of particular concern in certain annual or biennial vegetable crops, including lettuce, spinach, cabbage, onions, leeks, carrots, and beetroot. Warm temperatures and changes in day length can both trigger the phytohormonal changes that cause bolting, and it may also occur as part of the plant's natural response to stress. In many species it manifests as the sudden rapid growth of unusually elongated stems which, if not removed, will produce an inflorescence.
bone meal
A byproduct made from animal bones which have been steamed under high pressure and ground into a powder. A rich source of nitrogen, phosphorus, and calcium, bone meal is commonly used as an organic fertilizer for cultivated plants.
border irrigation
A type of flood irrigation in which a gently sloping field is divided into narrow strips by a series of low, parallel ridges of soil which align with the direction of the slope. Water is supplied to the upper edge or border of each strip, between the ridges, which act as levees to guide the flow of water as it moves down the length of the field by gravity. This method is useful for efficiently irrigating large areas of closely growing crops as well as certain row crops and orchards where topography and soils are suitable.
bran

The hard outer layers surrounding the endosperm in a cereal grain, consisting of the combined aleurone and pericarp and, in maize, also the pedicel. Bran is typically removed along with the germ during milling and thus excluded from refined grains, but remains included in whole grains. After removal it is commonly repurposed as animal feed.
branding
A technique for marking and identifying livestock in which a permanent scar, known as a brand, is made in the animal's hide, traditionally by applying an extremely hot or cold branding iron which has been shaped or placed in such a way as to create a unique, specific symbol or series of numbers, usually for the purpose of indicating ownership. Branding may be used in conjunction with other forms of animal identification, including earmarking, ear tagging, and radio-frequency identification (RFID).
branding iron
A handheld metal tool with one end shaped into a letter, number, or other symbol, intended as a unique identifier, which is heated, chilled, or electrified and then pressed against the skin of an animal in a process known as branding.
brash
1. The decaying residues of a previous crop, along with any weeds that may be present on or near the soil surface, in an area that has not been ploughed. This debris may impede subsequent cultivation unless it is removed or buried.
2. In forestry, the small branches and foliage removed when trees are felled. Where trees such as hazel are coppiced, brash is often placed over the stool to deter animals from browsing the regrowth.
brashing
The pruning of the lower branches of trees grown in arboriculture in order to make physical access easier and improve timber quality. See also coppicing.
breadbasket
A geographic region which, because it has a climate and soils well suited to grain farming, produces a large proportion of the total grain (or, by extension, other food products) consumed by a population or economy.
break crop
A secondary crop grown in a crop rotation scheme in order to disrupt the repeated cultivation of a primary crop. The break crop species is usually of a different family or genus than the primary crop species, and the most effective break crops not only interfere with the build-up of pathogens but also restore soil fertility.
breeder seed
The seed of a new variety of plant crop, grown from nucleus seed, that is multiplied, developed, controlled, and distributed with the highest genetic and physical purity under the supervision of the originating or sponsoring farmer or plant breeding institution, and which is of a quality suitable to be used for the production of foundation seed. Breeder seed represents the first tier of formal seed certification schemes.
broadacre
An expansive parcel of land suitable for farms practicing large-scale crop production. The term is used primarily in Australia.
broadcast seeding
A method of seeding that involves scattering seed over a relatively large and imprecise area, either by hand or mechanically, as opposed to precision seeding and hydroseeding. Broadcast seeding is easier and faster than seeding in rows but usually requires more seed and may result in overcrowded and uneven distributions of plant cover. It is generally reserved for plants that do not have strict spacing or depth requirements or that are easily thinned after germination.
broadfork

A handheld farming tool consisting of a series of long metal tines attached to a horizontal crossbar, operated with two long handles extending from either end, which is used to manually break up densely packed soil such as hardpan without inverting or mixing the soil layers and thereby preserving its structure, often as part of no-till or reduced-till seedbed preparation.

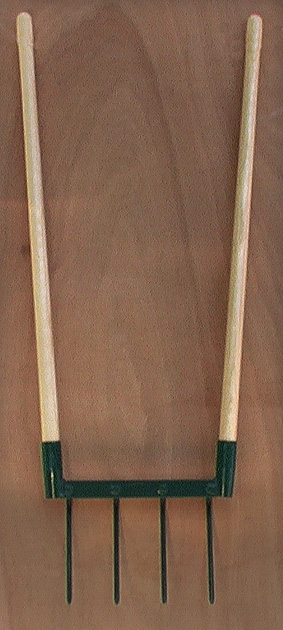
A broadfork

broiler

A chicken of either sex that is bred and raised specifically for meat production.
brood
1. A mature female animal, often a hen, which is kept for breeding purposes because of her strong mothering and nurturing instincts.
2. In apiculture, a bee brood, the collective name for the eggs, larvae, and/or pupae of a bee colony; or, more generally, the young offspring of any animal.
brooding

1. An instinctual behavior whereby female birds sit on a clutch of eggs to incubate them prior to hatching, often for very long periods of time without eating or drinking and generally characterized by the near-total devotion of the mother's time and energy to caring for the eggs. Many poultry species will naturally attempt to brood newly laid eggs if they are not collected first.
2. The practice in poultry farming of raising young chickens or turkeys in environments with warm, carefully controlled temperatures during the first few weeks of life.
brown manure
Withered or decaying plant material which is used as a mulch or an organic fertilizer simply by leaving it to decompose on the soil surface (rather than tilling it into the soil while still green, as with green manure). Brown manure may consist of uprooted or dehisced crop residues or even whole plants which are specifically grown for this purpose and then sprayed with a selective herbicide to cause them to wilt and die. This practice, known as brown manuring, is often employed as a no-till alternative to other fertilizing techniques.
browsing
A type of herbivory in which the herbivore feeds on leaves, soft shoots, or fruits of relatively tall, woody plants such as shrubs and trees, as opposed to grazing, which involves feeding on grasses and other low-lying vegetation. Browsing may also refer to feeding on any non-grasses, including both woody and herbaceous dicots.
Bt crop
buck

An intact adult male goat.
bucking
See hay bucking.
bull
An adult male bovine animal which has not been castrated (as opposed to a steer, which has been).

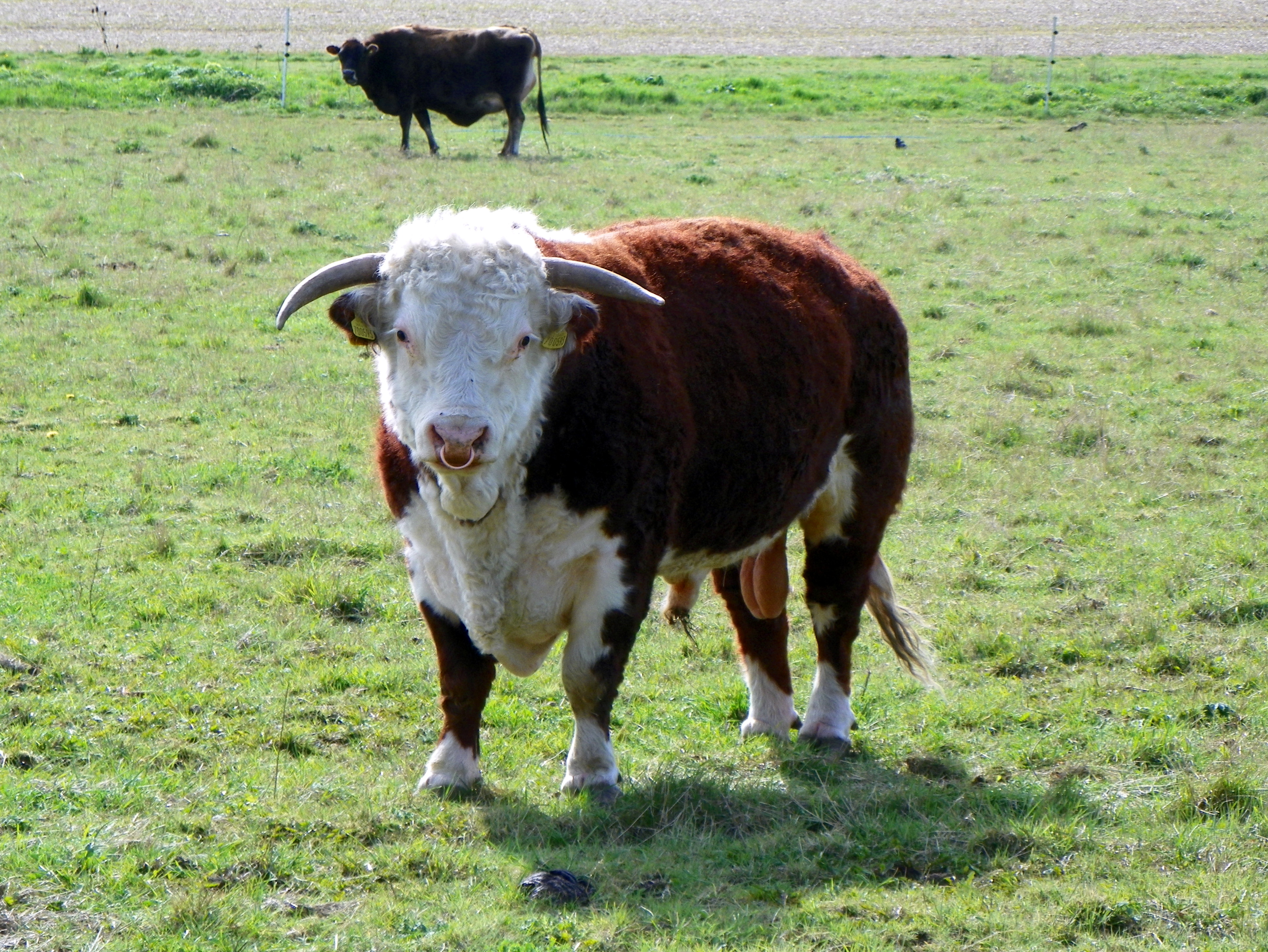
A male of the cattle species Bos taurus is called a bull.

bullock
See ox.
bumper crop
Any crop that yields an unusually large or productive harvest.
bushel

== C ==
calf

A young domestic bovine animal of either sex (i.e. a cow or bull), generally weighing less than 500 pounds. The term is usually applied from birth to weaning (which typically occurs around nine months of age), though it is also sometimes used until the animal is a yearling. Calves may be raised to become adult cattle, but are also commonly slaughtered for their meat, called veal, or their hides. The young of many other species, including bison, water buffalo, camels, and deer, are also called calves.
calf hutch
An enclosure used to house pre-weaned calves individually.
calving
The process of giving birth in cattle, by which a pregnant cow gives birth to a calf.
candling
In the poultry egg industry, the process of examining eggs for quality and defects by holding them in front of a bright light source, illuminating the internal contents of the egg through the translucent shell without having to break it open.
cane mill
A mill at which sugarcane is ground into raw sugar.
capon
A male chicken which has been castrated or neutered before reaching maturity, allowing it to grow faster and obtain a larger adult size.
care farming
The practice of farming (or of agricultural activities in general) for the purpose of providing or promoting mental or physical health or well-being, especially as a form of therapy or to aid convalescence or for social or educational services.
carryover
The supply of a farm commodity that is not yet used at the end of a marketing season and subsequently stored and made available for sale in the next marketing season. An excessively large carryover may be considered a surplus, and may cause prices to fall.
carton
1. A container used for fruit or other produce leaving a packinghouse.
2. A unit of mass or volume representing a standardized size of these containers, equal to 425 pounds (193 kilograms) or 4/5 US bushel (6.4 US dry gallons), respectively.
cash crop

Any crop that is grown so that it can be marketed and sold for profit, as opposed to a subsistence crop, which is grown for the grower's own use. While historically cash crops have often been only a small part of a farm's total yield, almost all modern crops in developed nations are grown primarily for revenue.
castration
The surgical removal or chemical impairment of the testes of a male animal, which prevents reproduction (irreversibly in the case of surgery, though potentially reversibly in drug-dependent chemical castration) and also greatly reduces the production of certain hormones, particularly androgens. It is commonly performed on livestock as a method of birth control, to mitigate aggressive or sexual behaviors, or to improve the commercial value of certain products harvested from the mature animal; e.g. steers are usually castrated at a young age in order to prevent age-related hormonal changes that would otherwise make them more difficult to fatten or alter the quality of their meat. The female equivalent is called spaying. See also gelding and neutering.
catalo
See beefalo.
catch crop
Any fast-growing crop that is grown between successive plantings of a primary crop on the same land. Its practice, known as catch cropping, is a type of succession planting.
cattle
A group of large, domesticated, bovid mammals of the genus Bos and especially the species Bos taurus, which are commonly raised as livestock for their meat (known as beef), their milk, their hides, their dung (used as manure or as fuel), or as draft animals or riding animals. Mature female cattle are known as cows, mature male cattle as bulls, and young cattle of either sex as calves, though colloquially "cow" is often used to refer to all bovine animals, irrespective of age or sex.
cattle cycle
The cyclical fluctuation of supply and prices observed in cattle markets, analogous to the pork cycle. In the United States, the cattle cycle refers to the approximately 10-year period during which the industry-wide population of beef cattle is alternately expanded and reduced over several consecutive years in response to perceived changes in profitability by beef producers. Low prices occur when cattle numbers or beef supplies are high, precipitating several years of herd liquidation; as cattle numbers decline and supplies diminish, prices gradually begin to rise along with renewed demand, causing cattle producers to begin breeding cattle and expanding their herds again.
cattle drive
See droving.
cattle prod
See goad.
cattle station
See station.
cattleman
See rancher.
cellular agriculture
The cultivation and production of agricultural products from cell cultures grown in a laboratory, such as cultured meat, by using techniques of molecular biology and biochemistry to directly synthesize the complex mixture of proteins, fats, and other substances which are found naturally in living tissues. Most of the industry is focused on cultivating animal products such as meat, milk, and eggs by growing animal tissues from stem cells in vitro and then simulating the same series of biochemical processes that occurs naturally in actual animal bodies, as opposed to raising and slaughtering farmed livestock as in conventional animal husbandry, which has long been criticized for its negative impacts on the environment, human health, food security, and animal welfare. Cellular agriculture has therefore been championed as a sustainable and ethical alternative, though the necessary procedures and infrastructure are usually highly specific and technical.
cellulosic fiber
Any fiber of plant origin, composed of ethers or esters of cellulose, hemicellulose, and/or lignin obtained from the bark, wood, or leaves of plants or another plant-based material. This includes natural fibers such as cotton, linen, jute, and hemp, as well as semi-synthetic fibers such as rayon and cellulose acetate.
census of agriculture
The periodic collection, processing, and dissemination of statistical data regarding agricultural activities within a country, state, county, or other polity. Agricultural censuses attempt to accurately measure and classify metrics such as number and size of farms or other holdings, types of land tenure and land use, crop acreage, livestock numbers, agricultural inputs and expenses, productivity and profits, types and uses of facilities and machinery, demographics of owners and workers, product quality, and sustainability, among others. In the United States and many other places, censuses are conducted at the holding level every five years.
center-pivot irrigation

A method of crop irrigation in which a long line of sprinklers mounted upon or dangling from a metal frame with multiple sets of wheels rotates slowly around a pivot at the center of a field, watering a very large circular area centered on this point. Water is usually supplied by a well or an underground pipeline near the pivot, and the wheeled frame is propelled by hydraulic pressure or electric motors. A typical center-pivot line is 400 metres (1,300 feet) long and capable of irrigating a 125-acre (51 ha) circle within a 160-acre (65 ha) square, covering about 78% of the surface area; some systems can also irrigate the corners of the square by means of an end gun at the end of the line or a trailing segment of frame that swings out into the corner areas. Modern center-pivot systems are often fully automated and programmable for specific rates of rotation, variable water distribution patterns, and other precision controls.

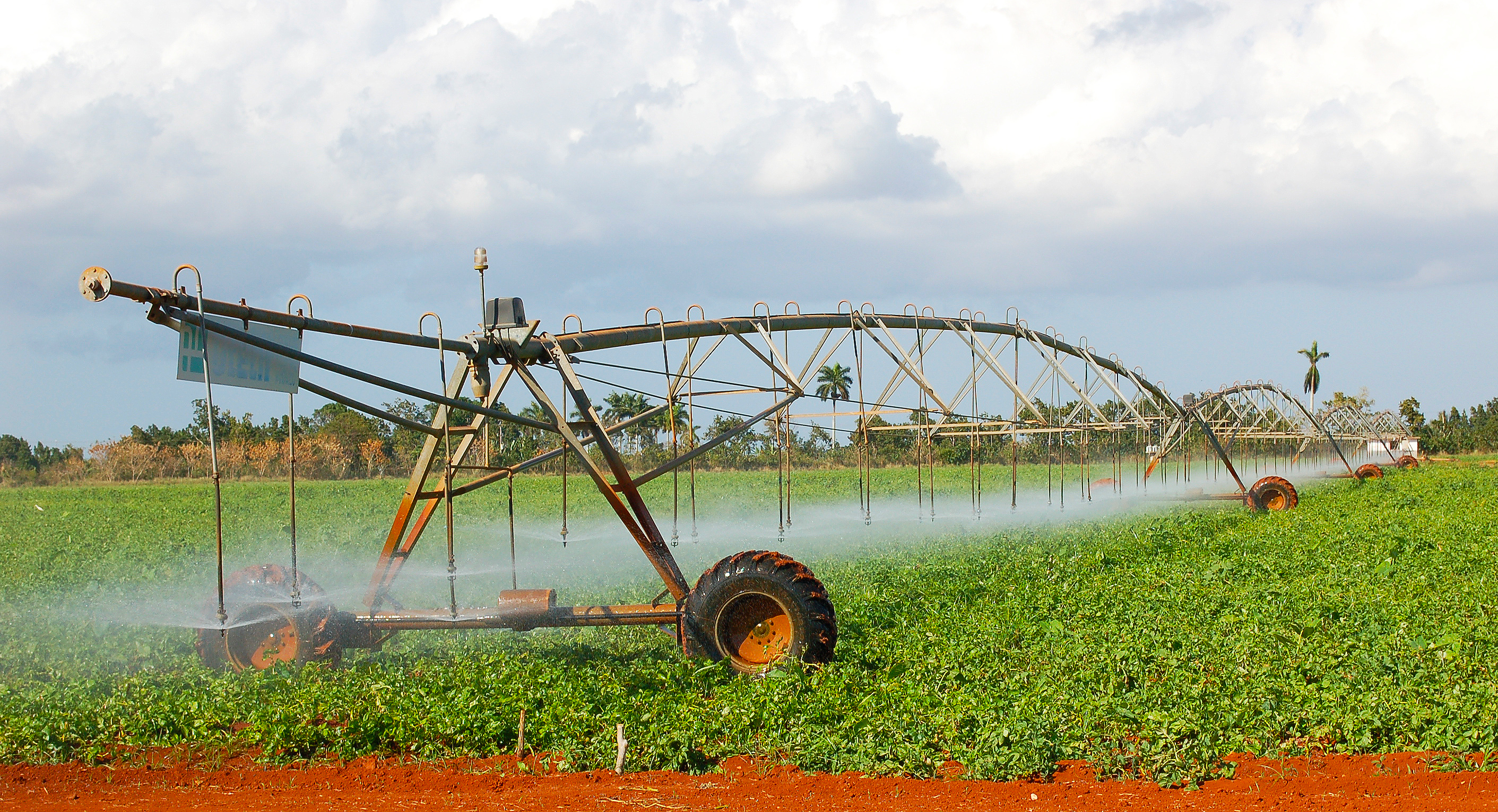
This center-pivot irrigation line on a bean field in Cuba takes 18–20 hours to make one complete circle.

cereal
Any member of the grass family cultivated for the edible components of its grain, composed of the endosperm, germ, and bran. The term may also refer to the resulting grain itself (the "cereal grain"). Compare pseudocereal.
certified seed
Plant seeds that have been approved by a certifying agency or agricultural retailer as meeting established standards of quality and productivity, e.g. of germination, varietal purity, sustainable sourcing, and/or freedom from contamination with disease-causing pathogens, weed seeds, and synthetic chemicals. See also registered seed.
chaff
The dry, scaly, protective casing around the seeds of cereal grains, or any other similar plant material. Chaff is generally inedible by humans but is often used as fodder for livestock or is ploughed into the soil as a type of green manure.
chemical fallow
The use of chemical herbicides to prevent the growth of vegetation on fallow land.
chemigation

The practice of delivering any natural or synthetic chemical compound or mixture of compounds (such as fertilizers, pesticides, soil amendments, etc.) to crop plants via the water supply used for irrigation.
chevon
The meat of a young goat.
chisel plough

A type of plough consisting of a long row of multiple shanks which break and loosen soil to depths of 46 centimetres (18 in) without inverting or turning it, leaving accumulated crop residues on the soil surface instead of burying them. Chisel plows are used to plow very deeply (such as to break up hardpan) without disturbing the organic matter present on the surface, in a process sometimes called chiseling, often as part of low-till or no-till practices.
circle irrigation
See center-pivot irrigation.
citriculture
The cultivation of citrus fruit trees.
cloche
A bell-shaped glass or plastic covering placed over an individual plant to protect it from cold temperatures, used especially in gardening. Row cover serves the same function on a larger scale. See also cold frame.
cock
See rooster.
cockerel
A young male chicken, generally less than one year old.
cold frame
An enclosure with a transparent glass or plastic roof, built low to the ground, that is designed to protect juvenile plants and small gardens from cold or wet weather. Cold frames are used to extend the growing season by acting as miniature greenhouses.
collective farming

Any type of agricultural production in which multiple farmers or producers run their holdings as a joint enterprise using shared land, water resources, machinery, equipment, or other agricultural inputs in order to meet common needs and goals. Communal farms may be either voluntary agricultural cooperatives or mandatory state farms owned and operated directly by a central government.
colostrum
The first milk produced by a cow following calving, generally rich in fat, protein, and immunoglobulins.
colt
A young male horse or mule, typically under four years of age.
columbarium
See dovecote.
combine harvester

A large agricultural machine designed to efficiently harvest a variety of different grain crops by combining three traditionally separate harvesting operations – reaping, threshing, and winnowing – into a single mechanical process. The harvested grain is stored either in an on-board compartment or offloaded into a separate storage bin, while the remaining straw and other undesirable residue is typically discarded on to the field.

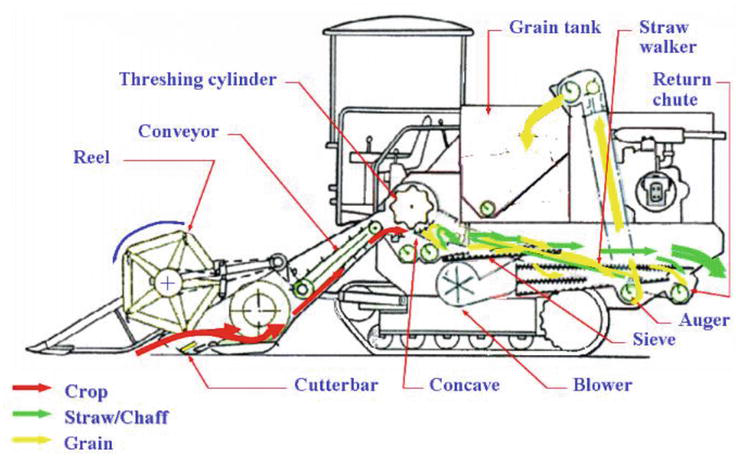
This cross-sectional schematic shows the flow of material through a typical combine harvester: the stalks of mature crop plants are cut by a series of blades at the front of the combine and conveyed to the interior of the machine (red); the useful grain (yellow) is then loosened and separated from the cut stalks and retained in an internal storage compartment, while all remaining crop residues, including chaff, husks, straw, etc. (green), are discarded onto the field behind the combine.

companion planting
The practice of planting different crops in proximity for any of a number of different reasons, including as a means of controlling pests, aiding pollination, providing habitat for beneficial insects, maximizing the use of space, or otherwise increasing agricultural productivity. It is a type of polyculture.
complete feed
compost
Any mixture of decomposing plant and food waste and/or other recycled organic materials that is used to fertilize and improve soils. Such mixtures are rich in plant nutrients and beneficial organisms which can increase soil fertility and aid plant growth by acting as a natural soil conditioner, increasing the humic content of the soil, and suppressing pathogens. Often compost is made simply by allowing gathered green and brown waste to decompose naturally in open-air piles for many months, though it can also be made with more precise measurements and controls.
compound feed
condensery
A manufacturing facility where condensed or evaporated milk is produced.
conservation tillage
Any tillage practice which aims to reduce soil erosion and preserve natural soil conditions, generally by leaving significant amounts of crop residue to cover previously harvested agricultural land; such practices can also enhance biological pest control and reduce fuel consumption and soil compaction. Conservation tillage includes no-till, strip-till, and mulch-till systems.
container gardening
The practice of cultivating plants by growing them in containers or pots rather than planting them in the ground. The containers are generally small, portable, plastic or ceramic pots or trays which limit the soil space available to the plant's roots but have the advantage of allowing the gardener to easily move the plant to avoid inclement weather or other suboptimal conditions.
continuous harvest
A method of cultivation whereby crops are harvested more or less continuously throughout an extended or indefinite growing season, without any significant pause or interruption such as for replanting. For most conventionally grown plant and animal crops, production is limited to specific times of year by the need for suitable weather or for periods of inactivity during which soils can recover fertility and producers can resupply inputs and otherwise prepare for the start of the next production cycle, meaning the harvested products are only available to consumers for a few weeks or months at the end of each growing season. In some places, however, where the climate is largely consistent throughout the year, or wherever labor and inputs are consistently available, certain crops may be grown, harvested, and sold during unusually long seasons or even year-round. Some seasonal crops can also have their harvest windows extended by growing them in highly controlled environments or by deliberately staggering planting times so that different groups of plants are of different ages and thus one or more groups are ready for harvest at any given time of year.
contour farming

The practice of ploughing and/or planting a sloping field by following its natural contour lines, such that the resulting furrows and crop rows curve around the slope perpendicular to the direction of the force of gravity, with each remaining at approximately the same elevation for its entire length. This orientation helps prevent surface runoff and soil erosion by reducing the velocity with which water and soil moves down the slope, minimizing the formation of rills and gullies during heavy precipitation and allowing more time for the water to settle into the soil. Contour farming also reduces the runoff of agrichemicals, power consumption, and wear on machines, thereby increasing production efficiency.
contract farming
Farming or other agricultural production carried out on the basis of an agreement between the buyer or consumer and the farmer or producer. Contracts typically involve the producer agreeing to supply certain quantities of a crop or other product according to quality standards and delivery requirements specified by the buyer, and the buyer agreeing to buy the product, often at a price established in advance; the buyer often also agrees to support the producer in various ways, e.g. by supplying inputs, assisting with land preparation, providing production advice, and helping to transport the finished product.
controlled traffic farming (CTF)
A farming practice which attempts to manage and reduce the damage done to cultivated soils by repeated passes of heavy agricultural machinery such as tractors over the same area of land, particularly soil compaction, which often has negative consequences for numerous aspects of crop production.
controlled-environment agriculture (CEA)
Any agricultural production that occurs in a specialized, enclosed space, typically indoors, where all variables affecting production (e.g. temperature and light intensity) can be carefully managed throughout the production cycle so as to provide an optimal environment that maximizes yield or efficiency or some other production target. Indoor growing spaces such as greenhouses are common examples, and the practice is central to urban agriculture and agricultural research.
conventional tillage
Traditional, intensive methods of tillage using a mouldboard plough, disc harrow, or other powered implement to mix and completely invert the entirety of the soil surface prior to or during planting. Conventional methods usually involve repeated passes of heavy machinery over the same field and tend to bury crop residues left by previous harvests; subsequent use of other implements is often necessary to smooth the soil surface. These practices contrast with conservation tillage and low-till methods, which aim to minimize soil disturbance.
coop
A building or shelter designed to house poultry birds such as chickens and to provide hens with a warm, dry place to nest and incubate their eggs.
co-op
See agricultural cooperative.
coppicing
A method of forest management by which the trunks and stems of young trees are regularly cut down to near ground level, exploiting the ability of many tree species to regenerate new growth from living stumps, known as stools. After a number of years of growth, the intended products of the coppiced tree are harvested and the cycle begins anew. Pollarding is a similar process carried out at higher levels on the tree; both practices are important techniques in silviculture.
copse
A forest that has been coppiced.
corn crib

A granary used to dry and store harvested maize.
corporate farming
The practice of large-scale agriculture on farms owned or greatly influenced by corporations or large private businesses. The concept includes not only corporate ownership of farmland and the means of production, but also the roles such companies play in influencing agricultural education, research, and public policy through lobbying and funding initiatives.
corral
An open, outdoor enclosure for livestock, often a fenced-in space for temporarily gathering a widely dispersed herd of cattle or horses.
cotton gin
A machine that automates the process of ginning cotton, separating cotton fibers from their seeds much more quickly and efficiently than traditional manual separation.
cover crop
Any plant that is planted as soil cover rather than for the purpose of being harvested. Cover crops may be used to manage soil erosion, soil fertility, water content, weeds, pests, agricultural diseases, and biodiversity on land that is repeatedly farmed. They are commonly off-season crops planted after harvesting a cash crop in order to help conserve the integrity of the land through a fallow period.
cow
An adult female bovine animal. Colloquially, the term is often used to refer to all kinds of cattle, irrespective of age or sex.
cowbell
A bell worn around the neck of free-roaming livestock, including but not limited to cattle, so that ranchers and herders can keep track of the animal's movements via the sound of the bell, which can be useful in hilly landscapes or vast plains when the animal is grazing out of view.
cow–calf operation

A ranch which specializes in producing young beef cattle, maintaining a permanent herd of cows in order to breed and rear their calves and then sell them to other operations while still young, either to other ranches where they are raised into adults or to slaughterhouses for their meat or hides.
cow-calf separation

The widespread but controversial practice, in the beef and dairy industries, of separating calves from their mothers shortly after birth.
creamery
A dairy operation or facility which processes raw milk and/or cream into finished dairy products, such as consumer-grade milk, butter, cheese, and ice cream, and prepares them for market.
creep feeding
The practice of supplementing the diet of young livestock which are still nursing, usually beef calves and swine, with prepared feed. This may be done in order to introduce the animals to feed before weaning or to facilitate quicker fattening, but is only cost-effective when the price of animal feed is very low.
crop
Any plant, animal, or other product of a living organism that can be grown and harvested extensively for profit or subsistence. The term may refer to the organism or species itself, the harvested parts, or the harvest in a more refined state. Most crops are cultivated in agriculture and its sub-disciplines, commonly (but not exclusively) as food for humans or fodder for livestock; other crops are gathered from the wild.
crop insurance
Insurance purchased by agricultural producers, often subsidized by a government agency, to protect against the loss of potential revenue from crop sales due to extraneous circumstances, such as reductions in crop yield caused by natural disasters (drought, floods, hail, etc.) or declines in the prices of agricultural commodities.
crop mark
crop residue
Any organic material left in an agricultural field or orchard after a crop has been harvested, such as stalks and stems, leaves, seed pods, etc., or after a crop is processed for consumer use, such as seeds, husks, roots, bagasse, or other byproducts of processing. Field residues may be maintained as soil cover, burned, or ploughed into the soil as green manure; process residues are often used as animal fodder or soil amendments.
crop rotation
The practice of cultivating a series of different crops in the same space over the course of multiple growing seasons, often in a specific sequence that repeats in a cycle every few seasons. The alternative to crop rotation, monocropping, may gradually deplete the soil of certain nutrients and select for highly competitive communities of pests and weeds, decreasing productivity in the absence of high volumes of external inputs such as fertilizers and herbicides. Crop rotation can reduce reliance upon these inputs by making use of the natural ecosystem services that accompany diverse sets of crops, usually by improving soil quality and reducing the probability of pests and weeds developing resistances to control measures.
crop water productivity
crop weed
Any weed or undesirable plant that grows among crop plants. See also weed of cultivation.
crop wild relative (CWR)
A wild plant taxon that is closely related to a domesticated plant taxon (e.g. a wild ancestor of the domesticated plant) and which therefore may be indirectly useful to plant breeders by presenting the possibility of introducing genetic material from the wild plant into the domestic relative by crossbreeding.
cropdusting

The use of an agricultural aircraft to apply protective chemicals or other amendments, especially pesticides and fertilizers, to crops from above. Such aircraft may include either fixed-wing airplanes or helicopters, but are typically highly specialized and purpose-built to distribute very large amounts of liquid product over very large land areas in a relatively efficient manner.
crop-lien system
A farm financing scheme whereby money is loaned at the beginning of a growing season to pay for farming operations, with the subsequent harvest used as collateral for the loan.
cropping
crutching

The removal of wool from around the anus, genitals, or udder of wool-bearing animals such as sheep, generally to prevent urine, feces, or dirt from becoming trapped in the wool near these areas and potentially contributing to the spread of disease.
cryophilous crop
A plant crop that requires a period of exposure to low temperatures in order to break dormancy and produce flowers and seeds.
cull
cultipacker
A farm implement consisting of a series of heavy, disc-shaped metal rollers, each bearing regularly spaced protrusions designed to crush dirt clods and push stones and field residues into the soil as they are pulled across a field (usually after it has been tilled and sown), with the goal of preparing a uniformly smooth, flat, firm seedbed devoid of air pockets, where seeds placed at shallow depths can maintain good contact with the surrounding soil.
cultivar

A cultivated variety of a particular plant species, domesticated by humans and artificially selected for desirable traits which distinguish it from other varieties of the same species, and which breeds true and retains those traits when propagated. Plant species grown as agricultural crops may have dozens, hundreds, or thousands of distinct cultivars which have been deliberately bred by farmers and horticulturists by carefully managing their reproduction over many generations, e.g. by planting asexual vegetative propagules or by crossbreeding specific plants to create hybrid offspring. Not all cultivated plants are considered cultivars; by the strictest definition the term may be reserved for officially registered or patented commercial varieties, though in common usage it may be applied more broadly, even to wild plants with distinctive characteristics.
cultivation
1. The act of improving an area of land for or by agriculture, especially through the deliberate growing of plants (but not necessarily excluding other types of agriculture). Land upon which plants are sown, nurtured, and harvested, or more broadly any land dedicated to agricultural purposes, is said to be cultivated.
2. Another name for tillage, especially the shallow, selective secondary tillage of row crop fields.
cultural control
An approach to pest control which emphasizes the modification of the agricultural environment in order to reduce the prevalence and proliferation of unwanted pests, as an alternative to applying chemical pesticides. Examples of cultural control include altering physical properties of the growing environment (e.g. soil pH or fertility, amount of sunlight, temperature, humidity, irrigation, etc.) in order to make it difficult or impossible for pests to live there, adhering to a strict program of fallowing and weeding, and using pest-eating predators such as chickens or ladybugs as a form of biocontrol. Systematic implementation of these practices can reduce the need for curative interventions and thus avoid the detrimental effects of conventional top-down approaches to pest control such as those associated with chronic pesticide use.
cultured meat

Meat-like animal tissue that is grown in a laboratory by culturing animal cells in vitro, in a process known as cellular agriculture, as opposed to meat obtained from whole animals that are raised on farms and then slaughtered.
custom harvesting
The contracting of independent operators of farm equipment to harvest crops, especially grains, on a particular farm. Custom harvesters provide their own combines and other machinery and often charge for their work by the acre, with additional charges for high yields.

== D ==
dagging
See crutching.
dairy cattle
Cattle bred or raised specifically for milk production, from which any of a variety of dairy products can be made. This is in contrast to cattle raised for other purposes, such as for their meat or so that they can be employed as working animals.
dairy farming

The breeding, raising, and management of dairy animals, primarily dairy cattle but also goats, sheep, and buffalo, for the purpose of producing milk and other dairy products.
dam
The female parent of an animal. The term is used alongside sire, especially for domestic mammals such as cattle and horses.
damping off
A disease of newly germinated seedlings caused by any of a variety of fungi (e.g. Rhizoctonia or Aphanomyces) which spread in warm, damp conditions and parasitize roots and lower stems. Damping off is a common cause of seedling loss in greenhouses.
dead hedge
dead stock
All implements, tools, appliances, and machinery used on a particular farm; sometimes inclusive of seed, fertilizer, and feedingstuffs.
deadheading
The practice of removing dead or spent flowers from a live plant in order to encourage further flowering, to prevent seed development, or to improve the plant's appearance. See also deblossoming.
deadweight
The weight of an animal carcass after slaughter. Animals raised for their meat may be sold on either a deadweight or liveweight basis.
deferred grazing
A grazing management method in which the grazing of livestock on a particular pasture or management unit is deliberately delayed for long enough to allow the natural growth and recovery of vegetation from prior grazing, i.e. to provide for the establishment of new plants or the restoration of existing plants before re-introducing the area to further grazing.
deblossoming

The practice of removing flowers, spent or unspent, from live plants for any reason, especially to encourage or improve the subsequent growth, reproduction, health, or appearance of the plant's non-flower parts. Deblossoming is often done in order to divert the plant's limited resources away from sexual reproduction and towards vegetative propagation, e.g. by roots and runners; early in a perennial plant's life in order to allow it to establish and grow to maturity before dedicating resources to reproduction; or near the end of the growing season in order to maximize the size and quality of existing fruits, seeds, or other useful crop parts by diverting energy and nutrients away from new buds that will likely not have time to develop into useful crops anyway.
defoliant
Any herbicidal chemical which causes leaves or other foliage to detach and drop from a plant. Defoliants are sometimes used on very leafy trees and shrubs to make finding and harvesting the non-leaf crop parts easier, or more commonly to control weeds.
deintensified farming
Any agricultural operation which was formerly intensive but has since become deliberately extensive.
dent corn

A type of field corn named for the characteristic indentation that forms at the crown of each wedge-shaped kernel. It is known for its high soft starch content, for which it is widely cultivated in order to produce animal feed, oils, waxes, paint, paper, and ethanol fuels.
dessert crop
Any crop that is (or historically was) grown or used only for special occasions, as an elite or luxury item, or for pleasure rather than sustenance. Crops historically considered dessert crops include coffee, tea, sugar, cocoa, and tobacco.
detasseling
In maize farming, the process of removing the pollen-producing flowers, known as tassels, from the tops of maize plants in order to prevent self-pollination. It is used as a crossbreeding strategy to ensure that the detasseled plants are receptive to pollen from non-self sources, e.g. from different cultivars when creating hybrid varieties.
dewatering
The removal of water from a harvested crop by pressing and compacting layers of plant material for long periods of time. Dewatering can be significantly cheaper than other artificial drying techniques.
dewattling
See dubbing.
deworming

The process of treating a domestic animal with any treatment intended to kill or prevent the proliferation of endoparasitic worms (i.e. a vermicide), including roundworms, flukes, and tapeworms, usually by applying an antihelminthic drug either orally (via a feed supplement or drenching), topically (by pouring a liquid on the animal's skin), or by injection.
diatomaceous earth

A naturally occurring siliceous sedimentary rock consisting of the fossilized shells of microscopic single-celled algae known as diatoms, generally in the form of a crumbly, abrasive powder composed of silica, alumina, and iron oxides. It has many applications in agriculture, including as an anti-caking additive in animal feed and stored grain, as an organic insecticide, and as a soil conditioner or growing medium, where its low density and high porosity allow it to retain water and nutrients, circulate oxygen, and drain quickly.
dibber

A handheld pointed wooden or plastic stick used to make small holes in soil so that seeds, seedlings, or small bulbs can be planted in them.
digeponics
digital agriculture

The use of electronic sensors, computers, and information technology to digitally collect, store, analyze, and share agricultural data.
dipping
The process of immersing a live animal into a bath containing a liquid formulation of insecticide (and sometimes also fungicide), usually a dilute solution of organophosphorus compounds, as a means of removing lice, ticks, or other ectoparasites which may otherwise cause disease. Sheep are commonly treated in a sheep dip, and cattle in a plunge dip.
disbudding
1. The process of destroying the horn-producing cells or "buds" on the heads of naturally horned young animals such as calves, kids, and lambs before the buds fuse to the skull. This is typically done by thermal cauterization or by applying a topical chemical paste to the bud, usually very early in life, when the animal is between a few days and eight weeks old. Disbudding prevents horns from growing before they start, whereas dehorning refers to the surgical removal of fully developed horns from older animals.
2. In horticulture, the selective pruning of flower buds, young shoots, or leaf buds from a plant with the goal of benefitting the growth of the remaining buds by forcing the plant to redirect its energy to them.
disc harrow

A type of harrow designed to till the soil surface and simultaneously chop up weeds and crop residues, consisting of one or more rows of concave metal discs which may be scalloped or oriented at an oblique angle and which rotate freely as the implement moves forward. It is usually pulled behind a tractor or mounted upon a three-point linkage.
diversified cropping
dockage
Waste material which is removed from grain as it is being processed, prior to milling.
docking

The intentional removal of all or part of an animal's tail by any of a variety of methods, usually by cutting with a knife or scalpel, applying a hot iron, or constricting blood circulation with a rubber ring to cause the tail to fall off. Docking of swine is performed in order to reduce potentially harmful tail biting behaviors between cohabitating pigs; in sheep and cattle, it is often practiced with the rationale that shorter tails are less likely to trap dirt and feces and transfer them to other body parts (e.g. the udder in dairy cattle), thereby reducing pathogen infestation and improving the animal's cleanliness and well-being and consequently the quality of any products harvested from the animal, though the efficacy of docking for these purposes has not been conclusively demonstrated.
doddie

A hornless cow or bull, especially one that has been polled.
doe

An adult female goat.
dogie

A stray or motherless calf. See also poddy.
domestication
dovecote

A man-made structure intended to house domestic pigeons or doves, usually consisting of a sheltered space with one or more holes allowing the birds to nest inside, either free-standing or built into the side or roof of a building.
draff
Refuse obtained as a byproduct of the distillation of grain and used as an animal feed, especially malt left over from the brewing process.
draft animal

An animal used to pull heavy loads such as wagons or ploughs, usually a horse, mule, donkey, ox, or camel.
drawbar

A horizontal metal bar on the rear of a vehicle such as a tractor to which trailers or farm implements may be hitched or attached.
drenching
The process of administering a liquid drug or medication to a domestic animal via the throat, usually for treatment of internal parasites.
dressed weight
The weight of an animal carcass after it has been slaughtered and partially butchered or "dressed", typically when still containing bones and cartilage but after the hide, head, hooves, and internal organs have been removed. When weighed immediately following slaughter and prior to chilling, it may be called the hot dressed carcass weight or hot dressed weight. Dressed weight is commonly used to calculate the price of meat.
drinker
An automated water line used to provide drinking water to livestock such as cattle or poultry.
drip irrigation

A type of micro-irrigation system that supplies water and/or liquid fertilizer solution to crops by allowing it to leak slowly from perforated plastic or rubber tubes into the soil surrounding the plants' roots, with the primary goal of delivering water directly to the root zone and thereby minimizing wasting due to evaporation and runoff (which are often significant problems in surface irrigation and sprinkler irrigation). Drip systems distribute water through a network of valves, pipes, emitters, and flexible, lightweight tubing called drip line or drip tape, which can be positioned above or buried below the soil surface. Drip irrigation is most commonly used in small-scale outdoor operations, high tunnels, and greenhouses, where it is often much more efficient than alternative irrigation methods and has the advantage of allowing water and fertilizers to be applied gradually, uniformly, and in precise quantities to each individual plant.

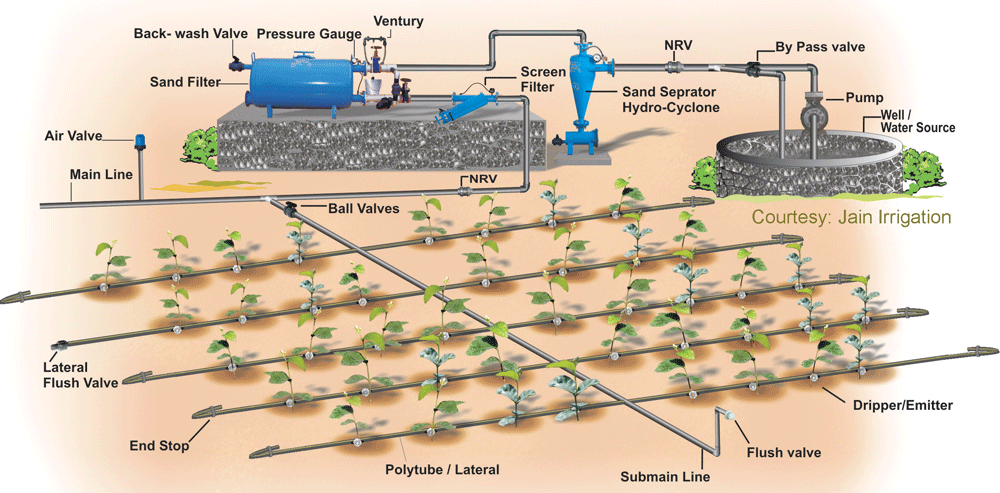
A typical layout for an outdoor drip irrigation system

drop shed

A shelter where lambing ewes are housed.
droving

The process of moving livestock on foot over long distances, generally by herding them together and encouraging or compelling them to walk in a particular direction. Very large herds of cattle, sheep, and horses are commonly moved in this way between different pastures, or from rangeland to a market where they can be sold; such a journey may be called a drive. Herds are traditionally moved by cowboys on horses, though drovers may also employ dogs, vehicles, and goads to keep the animals clustered together and moving in the right direction.
dry cow
A milk cow which has ceased to produce milk from a particular lactation, especially because it is within 60 days of calving and beginning a new lactation.
dry milling
dryland farming

The cultivation of plant crops in arid or semiarid climates, or wherever there is, for any reason, a relative scarcity of fresh water resources available for agricultural uses either year-round or during the growing season. Dry farming thus encompasses a set of agricultural techniques and management practices adapted specifically for growing crops without the aid of irrigation, which generally emphasize the strict conservation of existing soil moisture and the selection of cultivars which are drought-tolerant or otherwise well-suited for the specific challenges of arid environments. Other common dryland practices include wider than normal spacing between individual plants, minimal tillage and use of heavy machinery, aggressive weed control, and frequent fallowing.
dubbing

The removal of any of the fleshy caruncles from the heads of poultry, i.e. the comb, wattles, and/or earlobes. Dubbing is often done with the rationale that it reduces the chances that these parts will be injured, become infected, and thereby potentially compromise the bird's overall health, though the practice has been criticized for being unnecessarily stressful to birds, and also because combs and wattles are thought to have important functions in the regulation of body temperature and in certain social behaviors.
dynamic compaction
A method of increasing the density of soil deposits by repeatedly dropping a very heavy weight onto the ground at regularly spaced locations, which can compress underground voids, improve soil structure and stability, and prevent settling and undesirable soil movement beneath buildings. It has many applications, including in agriculture, where it can be used to increase water and amendment retention in seedbeds, especially when subsurface constraints make alternative methods of compaction inappropriate.

== E ==
earlage
A high-energy feed for cattle composed of ears of maize (both kernels and cobs) chopped into small pieces and fermented into silage.
earmark
A cut or notch made in, or a tag attached to, one or both ears of a livestock animal (most commonly cattle, pigs, goats, and sheep) as an easily visible mark of identification, usually to indicate age, sex, medical status, or ownership. Compare brand.

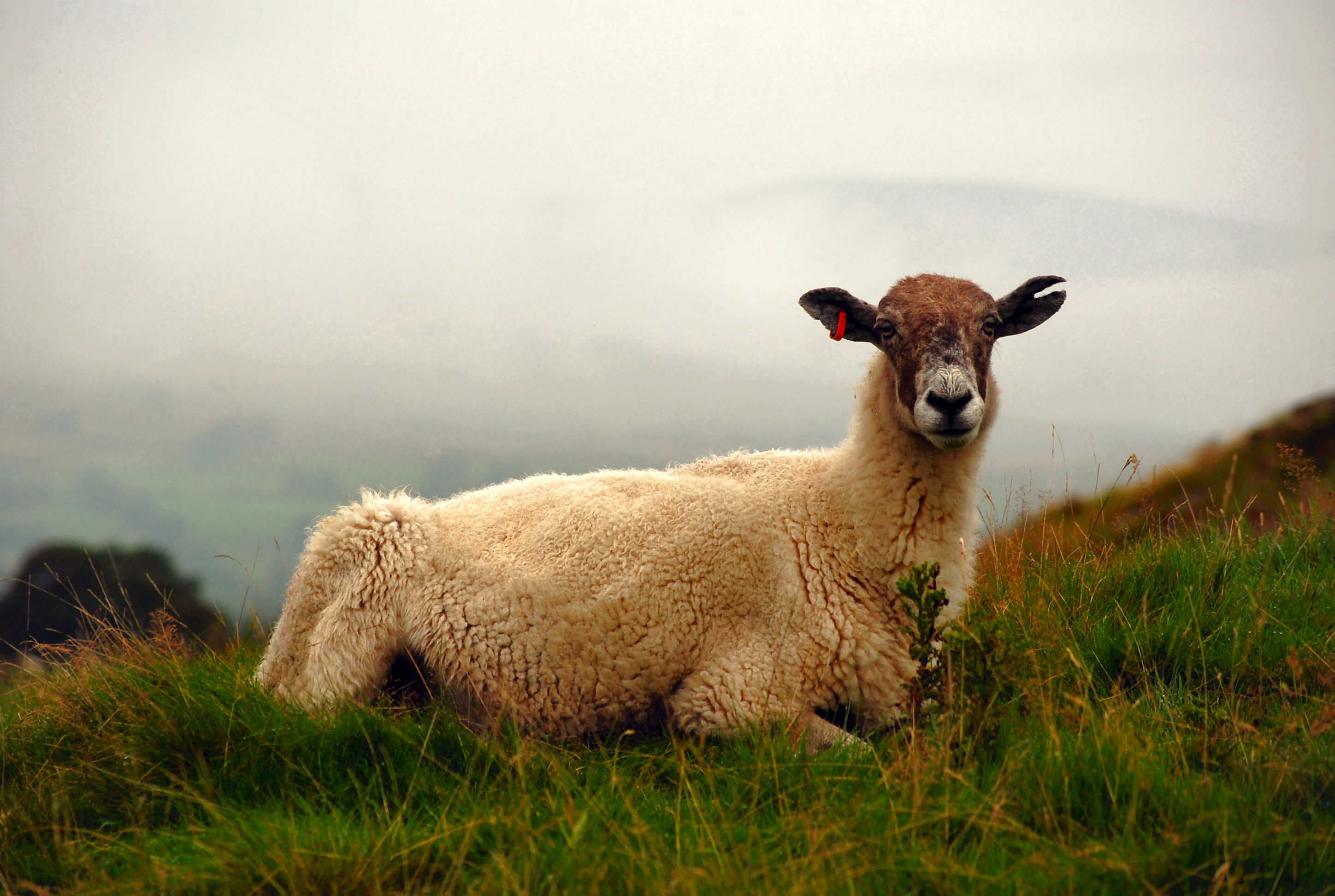
A sheep with two visible earmarks–a notch made in one ear and a tag attached to the other

earthing up
See hilling.
ecological farming
1. Another name for organic farming.
2. A specific approach to organic and sustainable agriculture that focuses on the environmental and ecological aspects of farming, emphasizing the incorporation of methods which prevent soil erosion, preserve or improve water percolation and soil retention, limit greenhouse gas emissions, sequester carbon in the form of humus, increase biodiversity, and regenerate ecosystem services, and thereby minimizing the environmental pressures posed by conventional agricultural systems. Specific techniques include polyculture, no-till farming, cover cropping, strip cropping, contour farming, shelterbelts, and use of biodigestors, among others.
ecology
The scientific study of interactions between biological organisms and their biotic and abiotic environments. It is an interdisciplinary field that includes biology, geography, and Earth science.
economic maturity
The optimum time at which to harvest a tree or stand of trees (or any other perennial plants), as determined by the age at which the growth rate slows enough to cause the average annual profit over the life of the stand to begin to decrease.
edaphology
The scientific study of the influence of soils on living organisms, particularly plants, and of how soils are used and modified by humans for agriculture.
edge effects
Changes in ecological characteristics (e.g. population or community structure) associated with the boundary between two dissimilar habitat types, ecosystems, or agricultural land uses, potentially affecting the biological and ecological traits of the resident plant or animal communities.
effective precipitation
The portion of the cumulative or mean total precipitation received within a specified area, on a particular farm or field, or by an individual plant during a given time period that is or becomes available for plant growth because it is stored in the soil within the rooting depth of the plants or persists on the surface long enough to eventually drain into and occupy that rooting depth before it is lost by evaporating or running off.
emblements
energy crop
Any crop grown exclusively as a source of fuel for the purpose of energy production. Such crops are processed into solid, liquid, or gaseous biofuels (as with bioethanol and biogas) which are then burned to generate power or heat for human purposes.
ensiling
See silage.
entire

(of a domestic animal) Not neutered or castrated; capable of giving rise to offspring via copulation.
ewe
A female sheep, especially one that is sexually mature.
exclosure
An area of land from which grazing or browsing animals, often domestic livestock but sometimes wild animals such as deer, are excluded by fencing or other means. Fenced exclosures are common in open range areas, where it is the landowner's responsibility to keep unwanted animals off their land.
extensive agriculture

Any system of agricultural production that uses small inputs of labor, fertilizer, and/or capital relative to the land area used for production, in contrast to intensive agriculture.

== F ==
factory farming
See intensive animal farming.
fallow
1. (adj.) The condition of any arable land which is deliberately not planted or which is left unsown for one or more production cycles or growing seasons, usually with the intent of allowing the soil to restore depleted nutrients and other organic matter that is critical for ecological function, while retaining moisture and disrupting the life cycles of agricultural pests by temporarily removing their hosts. Fallowing is an important technique in crop rotation.
2. (n.) Any period of time during which arable land is not used for cultivation.
fallow crop
A crop that is grown in widely spaced rows so that it is possible to hoe and cultivate between the rows.
family farm
A farm which on average produces a harvest sufficient to support one family, or a farm which is owned and/or operated by a single family, as opposed to farms operated as collectives, non-family corporations, or in other institutionalized forms.
farm
An area of land devoted primarily to agricultural processes with the primary objective of producing food or other crops. In common usage the term may include ranches, feedlots, orchards, plantations, smallholdings and hobby farms, fish farms, and even industrial operations such as wind farms.
farm assurance
A type of agricultural product certification that emphasizes the principles of quality assurance and signals to consumers that the certified producer has adhered to a particular set of standards and principles during production, such as in good agricultural practice.
farm crisis
A predominantly American term for an agricultural recession.
farm gate value
The market value of an agricultural product minus the subsequent costs of transporting, storing, marketing, and selling the product to a consumer; the net value of the product as it is at the "farm gate", i.e. upon leaving the agricultural operation, before such costs are added to the market price. The market or retail price paid by the consumer is often far higher than the amount the farmer actually receives for the product, particularly if the farmer sells wholesale to a retailer rather than directly to the end consumer as in farm gate marketing.
farm stand

A type of retail outlet which sells fresh produce directly from a particular farm or group of farms. Direct sales to consumers allow farmers to retain a larger portion of the resulting profit than they can usually obtain by selling to a wholesaler. See also farmers' market.
farm water
Water that is committed for use in agriculture of any type. Farm water may include water used in the irrigation of crops as well as in the watering of livestock.
farm-to-fork
The tracing or connecting of all stages of the supply chain of a food from production to consumption.
farm-to-market
A movement in sustainable agriculture that promotes the sale of farm products by the farmers or producers themselves directly to the end-consumers, as opposed to indirectly via intermediate retailers.
farm-to-table

A movement in sustainable agriculture which promotes the consumption of locally produced foods, and particularly the serving of such foods at public establishments such as restaurants and school cafeterias. This is usually accomplished by purchasing food directly from the farmers or producers (rather than an intermediate retailer), or by the restaurant or school cultivating its own food. Farm-to-table emphasizes food traceability, freshness, and environmental awareness. The idea is central to the practice of locavorism.
farmer
A person who owns or works on a farm; or anyone who participates in agricultural production, especially the raising of field crops, poultry, or livestock.
farmers' co-op
See agricultural cooperative.
farmers' market
A retail marketplace, often outdoors, where farmers are able to sell fresh produce, live plants and animals, and sometimes prepared foods and other agricultural products directly to consumers (rather than to a wholesaler). These markets are often community-organized businesses consisting of multiple farm stands operated independently by individual farmers, who are free to set up a booth or table and sell their own goods at prices they set themselves.
farming
The practice of intentionally performing an agricultural activity, such as growing crops or raising livestock, on land dedicated to the purpose, known as a farm. The term is often used very loosely to refer to many different agricultural processes of different scales and with different goals, or, in the broadest sense, as a synonym for agriculture in general.
farmland
See agricultural land.
farmstead
The set of buildings and service areas associated with a farm or other agricultural holding, traditionally including residential accommodations such as a farmhouse for the operator's family as well as various buildings dedicated to the particularities of agricultural production, including pens, yards, stables, and corrals for housing draft animals or livestock; barns, silos, and mangers for storing crops, grains, or animal fodder; garages and sheds for storing farm vehicles and equipment; and other structures involved in the processing of raw materials into commercial products. The farmstead as a whole typically consists of a core complex of such buildings as well as clusters of outlying buildings.
farrow
A young domestic pig, or a litter of newborn pigs. See also piglet.
farrowing
The process of giving birth in swine, by which a pregnant sow gives birth to a farrow.
fatling
A young animal, e.g. a calf or lamb, that has been fattened in preparation for slaughter.
fatstock
Livestock which have been fattened in order to be slaughtered for meat, particularly those animals that have achieved the target weight and conformation required for slaughter.
fattening
See finishing.
feather meal
A protein supplement included in some formulated animal feed and organic fertilizers as a nitrogen source, made by grinding and drying poultry feathers under elevated heat and pressure.
fed cattle
Cattle at the time they leave a feedlot, i.e. after fattening and finishing, when they are ready to be sold for slaughter.
feed
See fodder.
feed grain
Any cereal grain grown specifically so that it can be used as fodder to feed livestock. Corn, barley, and sorghum are commonly grown for this purpose.
feeder
1. A receptacle from which domestic animals are fed, such as a manger or a hayrack. Some feeders have separate compartments for fresh forage and concentrate feed.
2. Any farm implement or machine used to distribute animal feed.
3. A domestic animal raised for its meat that is of sufficient age and weight to be placed into a feedlot for finishing prior to slaughter.
feedlot

An animal feeding operation consisting of a densely concentrated area of enclosures or pens containing individual animals, which is used for the efficient raising, fattening, and finishing of numerous livestock prior to slaughter, especially beef cattle, but also swine, horses, sheep, and poultry.

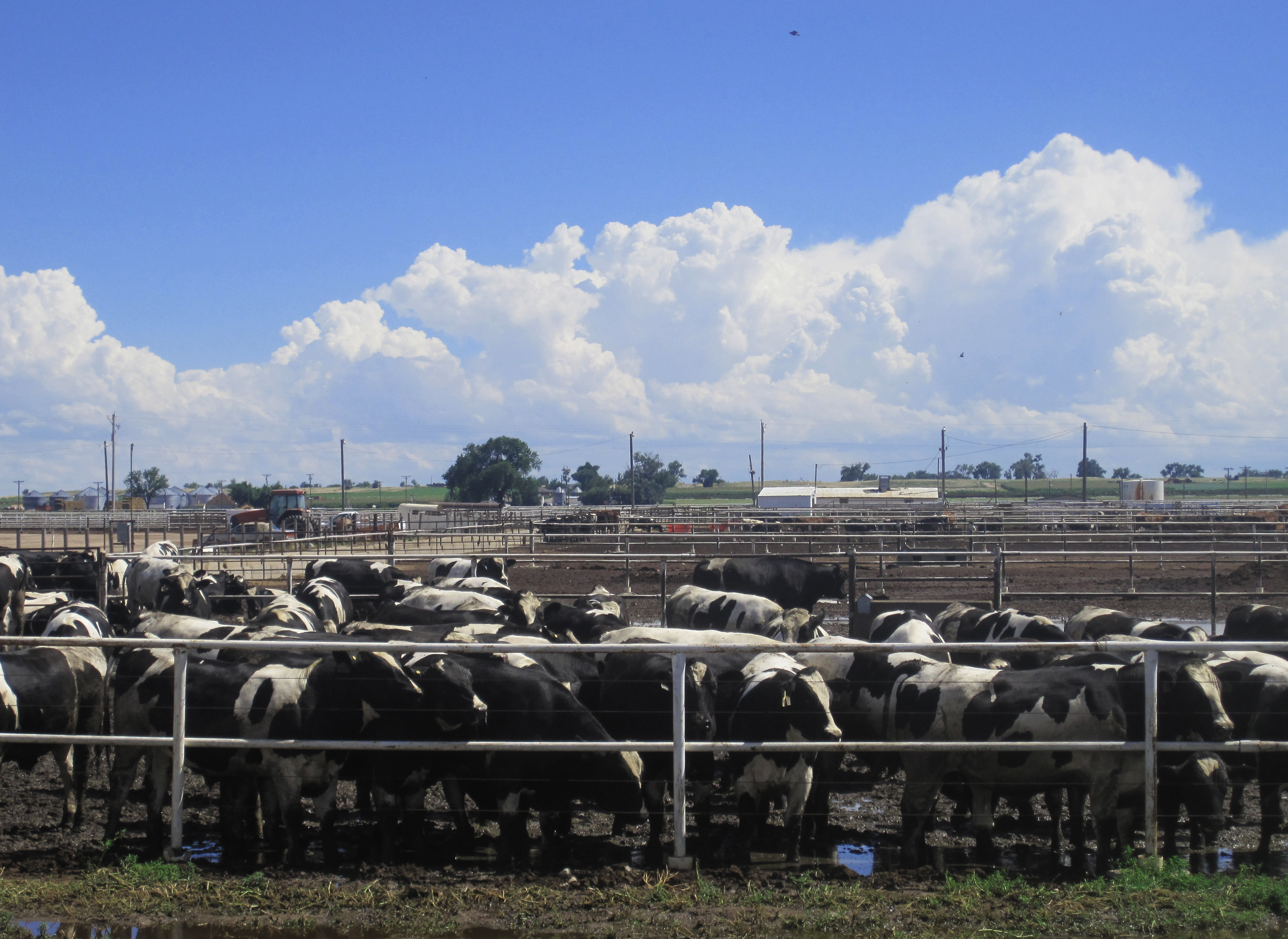
Cows in a feedlot in Colorado

fencerow
The area of ground immediately adjacent to a fence that is left unmowed or untilled because it is difficult or inconvenient to maneuver large agricultural machinery in this space without removing or damaging the fence. Grasses and weeds are therefore able to grow unrestricted in this area, often providing shelter for birds and wild animals, unless more precise tools are employed.
fertigation
The application of fertilizers, soil amendments, or other water-soluble compounds to agricultural land by mixing them with the water distributed by an irrigation system.
fertilizer

Any natural or synthetic material that is applied to soil or to plant tissues to supply one or more nutrients essential to the growth of plants.
fiber crop
Any crop plant cultivated for the fiber that can be produced from it, e.g. cotton, flax, sisal, and jute.
field
Any area of land, enclosed or otherwise, used for agricultural purposes, such as for the cultivation of crops or as a paddock for livestock.
field crop
Any crop suited to cultivation in a large open field, or which must generally be grown in great quantities, on a larger scale than in gardens, in order to produce a meaningful yield, such as most cereals, hay, and cotton.
field day
A large public trade show for the agricultural industry at which agricultural equipment, techniques, and business ideas are exhibited and demonstrated.
filly
An immature female horse, too young to be called a mare (generally less than four or five years old).
filter strip

A strip of grass or other dense, permanent vegetation lining the edge of an agricultural field and acting as a buffer zone between the field and its surrounding environment, usually designed with the primary goal of controlling non-point source pollution by filtering agricultural surface runoff before it drains into an adjacent body of water, e.g. a pond, lake, stream, diversion terrace, or irrigation canal. The roots of the vegetation trap and remove agrichemicals including fertilizers and pesticides from the runoff and may also help reduce sediment erosion, thereby preventing the contamination and eutrophication of natural ecosystems.

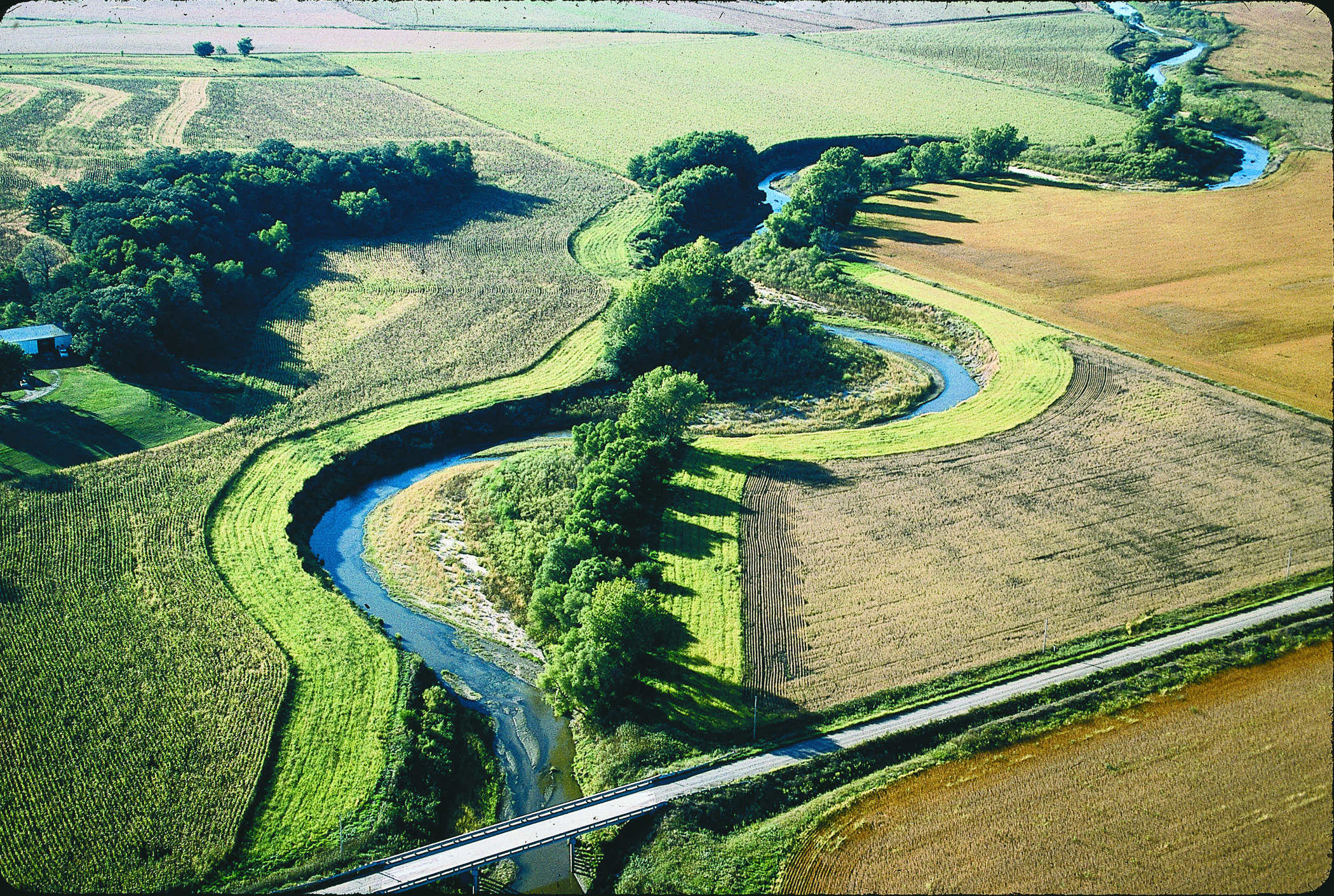
Filter strips (light green) separate agricultural fields from a natural stream in the U.S. state of Iowa

finishing

The bringing of livestock such as cattle up to market weight, or the weight at which they are ready to be slaughtered, by feeding them. Some ranching operations specialize in finishing, buying young weanlings from a breeder, fattening them on fodder or forage, and then selling them to a slaughterhouse.
fire farming
The use of fire to clear patches of land for cultivation. See also slash-and-burn and shifting cultivation.
fired
(of a plant's lower stems or stalks) Extremely dry or desiccated due to drought or nutrient deficiency.
fish emulsion
A nutrient-rich emulsion used as a fertilizer for plant crops, produced from the liquid remains of fish which have been industrially processed for fish oil or fish meal.
fish farming
See pisciculture.
fixing
See neutering.
flash grazing
The practice of moving numerous head of grazing livestock into the same area of pasture for a very brief period before moving them to a new area, in order to prevent the excessive growth of forage. See also undergrazing.
flat planting
The sowing of seed upon flat, unfurrowed land using a planter that minimizes disturbance to the smooth soil surface.
flood irrigation
Any method of surface irrigation that covers the entire cultivated soil surface with water, usually to a specific depth and for a specific duration. Flood irrigation may be carefully controlled, as with basin irrigation and border irrigation, or may simply rely on the natural flooding of adjacent rivers and streams.
fleece
The shorn wool of an individual sheep, especially when in the form of grease wool (i.e. newly shorn and not yet scoured or processed).
flock
A group or herd of sheep; or a group of birds such as poultry, especially when travelling together.
floriculture

A branch of horticulture involving the cultivation of flowering plants and ornamental plants for gardens and landscaping as well as for commercial floristry.
flushing
In animal husbandry, the practice of changing the diet fed to female livestock prior to breeding, with the intention of stimulating the estrous cycle and increasing ovulation rate.
foal
A young equine animal (a horse or donkey) of either sex, usually less than one year old. A male foal may be called a colt and a female foal may be called a filly, though these terms may also be used for juvenile animals that are older than one year of age.
foaling
The process of giving birth in horses or donkeys, by which a pregnant mare gives birth to a foal.
fodder

Any agricultural foodstuff used to feed domesticated livestock, and more specifically food given to the animals directly (such as hay, straw, silage, and compound feeds), as opposed to that which they forage for themselves.
food security
The availability of edible food within a country or other geographic area and the ability of humans within that area to access, afford, and attain sufficient, safe, and nutritious foodstuffs, either by gathering, producing, or importing them, in order to meet their dietary needs for active and healthy lifestyles.
food systems
The totality of interconnected principles, processes, and infrastructures that influence food, nutrition, health, and agriculture in human communities; i.e. the complete set of components involved in feeding a human population, including the growth, management, harvesting, processing, packaging, storage, distribution, marketing, consumption, and disposal of agricultural food products and food-related items. Food systems encompass the entire range of actors and their value-adding activities in the lifespan of a food product from production to consumption, and thus operate within and are influenced by numerous social, political, economic, technological, and environmental contexts at various steps in the process.
foodscaping

The practice of integrating edible plants into ornamental landscapes, cultivating them not only for the food they produce but also for their aesthetic qualities.
foodshed
The geographic region which produces most or all of the food consumed in a particular place or by a particular population, by analogy with a watershed.
food-feed system
An integrated livestock-crop production system in which crops are harvested for human consumption and then the crop residues or byproducts are used as feed for livestock, often on the same or nearby agricultural land.
foliar feeding
The practice of providing supplemental nutrition to plants by applying liquid fertilizer directly to their leaves, stems, or bark, as opposed to their roots, which are the usual target for conventional fertilizing methods. Most plants are perfectly capable of absorbing nutrients through these aboveground parts, and there may be good reasons to prefer that the nutrients travel by these routes rather than through the soil surrounding the roots.
forage
Any plant material, especially leaves and stems, eaten by grazing livestock, especially that which is grazed by animals in pastures. In a looser sense it may also include fodder (plant material deliberately cut and given to animals as food).
forcing
The practice of intentionally breaking the dormancy of a cultivated plant and encouraging germination, active growth, and/or flowering and fruiting outside of its natural growing season (e.g. in the winter). This involves exposing a seed or other propagule, or a mature perennial plant, to a specific sequence of carefully controlled environmental conditions (e.g. cold stratification) intended to simulate the environmental cues the plant normally receives at the beginning of its seasonal growth cycle, which trigger the internal chemical reactions that cause it to grow and develop. The term is used particularly in the indoor horticulture of plants that grow from bulbs, corms, or rhizomes, but can also refer more broadly to the off-season cultivation of any plant or propagule.
forest farming
A practice in agroforestry involving the cultivation of high-value specialty crops under a forest canopy that is deliberately modified or maintained to provide habitat and shade levels which enhance crop yields. Most crops produced by such methods are non-timber forest products or niche crops such as ginseng and certain varieties of mushroom.
foundation seed
The progeny of breeder seed, cultivated, handled, and distributed by trained officers of a specialized breeding program or agricultural experiment station in conformity with the standards of a formal seed certification framework so as to maintain extremely high genetic purity (generally exceeding 99 percent) and varietal identity. Foundation seed represents the second tier of seed certification and is usually defined by the highest degree of regulatory oversight. It is the source of all higher classes of certified seed, either directly or by first being used to produce registered seed.
founder

Inflammation of connective tissues known as laminae in the hoof of an animal, especially horses and cattle, which over time can displace bones in the foot and in severe cases render the animal unable to walk or stand up. It can have many causes, including cold weather, excessive stress, and overeating grain or green forage.
free range
A method of animal farming and animal husbandry in which the animals are permitted to roam freely outdoors, rather than being confined in enclosures, for at least part of each day. Though in practice the outdoor ranging area is usually fenced-in and therefore technically also an enclosure, free-range systems offer the opportunity for extensive locomotion, fresh air, and sunlight that is otherwise reduced or entirely prevented by indoor housing systems. The term may apply to farming for meat, eggs, or dairy products; in ranching, it is sometimes used interchangeably with open range.
freemartin
An infertile female bovine animal (a cow) that shows masculinized behavior, in particular one that is born as a twin to a male animal and, despite being phenotypically female, is actually a genetic chimera, having acquired some XY cells by exchange of cellular material with the male twin in utero, causing various hormonal alterations to normal female reproductive development.
freshening
The process by which cows naturally begin to produce milk after a calf is born.
frost control
Any of a variety of measures taken to reduce or prevent damage to agricultural crops caused by extremely cold temperatures, especially plants on farms, in gardens, and in orchards. Common frost control methods include covering crop plants with cold frames, keeping soils wet with continuous irrigation, and providing supplementary heat sources such as smudge pots.
fruticulture
See pomology.
fryer
A chicken of either sex between 8 and 12 weeks of age and weighing 3 to 4 pounds (1.4 to 1.8 kg), especially one raised specifically for meat production. The term is often used interchangeably with broiler.
fuelwood
Any wood intended for use in cooking, heating, or power generation, valuable for its ability to produce large amounts of energy when burned. It may come from trees cultivated specifically for this purpose, or from wild trees and shrubs, either as trimmings from the woody trunks and branches of live plants or from dead logs, brush, or other woody debris.
fungiculture
The cultivation of fungi with the goal of producing any of a variety of products that can be used by humans, such as foods, medicines, or scientific research materials.
fur farming
The practice of breeding or raising certain animal species in order to harvest their fur.
furrow irrigation
A type of irrigation which relies on long, shallow, parallel channels, known as furrows, dug into the soil along the length of an agricultural field to deliver water to crops planted on the ridges between the furrows. Water is applied to one end of the furrows, which are often aligned in the direction of the field's predominant natural slope, and flows down the furrows by gravity. Furrow irrigation is particularly suited to broadacre row crops such as cotton, maize, and sugarcane.

== G ==
garden
Any indoor or outdoor space reserved for the cultivation, display, and enjoyment of wild or domesticated plants and other organisms; i.e. a plot of land dedicated to horticulture, being managed and maintained by humans in a practice known as gardening, generally on a scale smaller than most farming operations.
gardening
The horticultural practice of growing and cultivating plants in a garden, indoors or outdoors, whether for consumption of the produce or for aesthetic reasons, and often as a hobby or to make use of available space on residential, commercial, or civic land. Gardening involves active participation in the entire process of cultivation and tends to be labor-intensive, which distinguishes it from the much larger-scale mechanized or automated operations often encountered in farming and forestry.
gelding
1. A castrated male horse, or more generally any animal deliberately made sterile, especially one that was castrated before reaching reproductive maturity.
2. The process of castrating or neutering an animal for any reason, commonly for mitigating aggressive behavior and/or preventing unwanted intercourse in very large domestic livestock such as cattle and horses.
genetically modified organism (GMO)
germination
The sprouting of a seedling from a plant seed, the development of a sporeling from a spore, or the growth of a pollen tube from the pollen grain of a seed plant.
gestation crate

An enclosure in which a domestic sow used for breeding is confined during pregnancy. Often these cages are not much larger than the sow herself, being designed to maximize breeding efficiency for industrial-scale production, and hence are banned in some jurisdictions for being detrimental to animal welfare. See also maternity pen.
ghost acres
That land area in less developed countries on which agricultural products are produced cheaply for export to more developed countries.
gilt
A young female hog, usually less than one year old.
ginning
The process of separating cotton fibers from the seeds they naturally enclose, particularly when performed by a machine which does so automatically, known as a cotton gin. Both the fibers and seeds may then be processed further.
glasshouse
See greenhouse.
gleaning
The practice of collecting unharvested crops from fields or obtaining unused agricultural products from farmers, processors, or retailers, often for distribution to food banks or charitable organizations.
glyphosate
An organophosphorus compound widely used as a post-emergent broad-spectrum systemic herbicide and crop desiccant, especially to kill annual broadleaf weeds and grasses that compete with crop plants. It is the primary ingredient in the herbicide Roundup.
goad

A pointed stick, sometimes electrified, used to drive or guide livestock, especially cattle, both draft animals and grazing herds.
gobbler
A mature male turkey.
good agricultural practice (GAP)
Any collection of specific principles or methods applied by agricultural producers in order to create food or non-food products that are safe, healthy, and wholesome for consumers while also taking into account economic, social, and environmental sustainability. GAPs may be applied to a wide range of production systems and at different scales, and often vary with geographical context.
grain
Any small, hard, dry seed (with or without the outer shell or other parts of the fruit) that is harvested for human or animal consumption, or the plant from which these seeds are harvested. Crops considered grains include all cereals (such as maize, wheat, and rice) as well as pseudocereals (amaranth, buckwheat, quinoa), certain legumes (soybeans and lentils), and certain oilseed plants (rapeseed and flax).

Cut-away diagram of the edible seed of a typical grain plant, in this example a kernel of wheat (Triticum aestivum), showing the bran, germ, and endosperm and their respective nutritional value

grain drying
The process of removing or reducing the moisture content of harvested grain to prevent spoilage during storage. Drying may occur by natural means, e.g. exposing the grain to air and sunshine, or by artificial fuel- or electric-powered processes, or both.
grain elevator

A tower containing a bucket elevator or pneumatic conveyor designed to carry harvested grain upwards from a lower level (often from some type of transport) and deposit it into a silo or grain bin for long-term storage. The term may also refer more specifically to the elevator mechanism itself, known as a grain leg; or more generally to a complex of agricultural buildings containing an elevator, as well as offices, weighbridges, and storage facilities, or to a business or organization that operates or controls multiple elevators in different locations. Grain elevators facilitate the mechanical movement of bulk quantities of grain into vertical storage bins with valves at the bottom, which function as enormous hoppers from which the grain can later be dispensed into trucks or barges by gravity alone, obviating the difficult and time-consuming labor of manually lifting and moving individual containers of grain from place to place. The introduction of this system in the 19th century popularized the modern collective storage model whereby a grain elevator rents storage space to farmers and millers, who pay to store their harvested grain at the elevator instead of in their own barns.

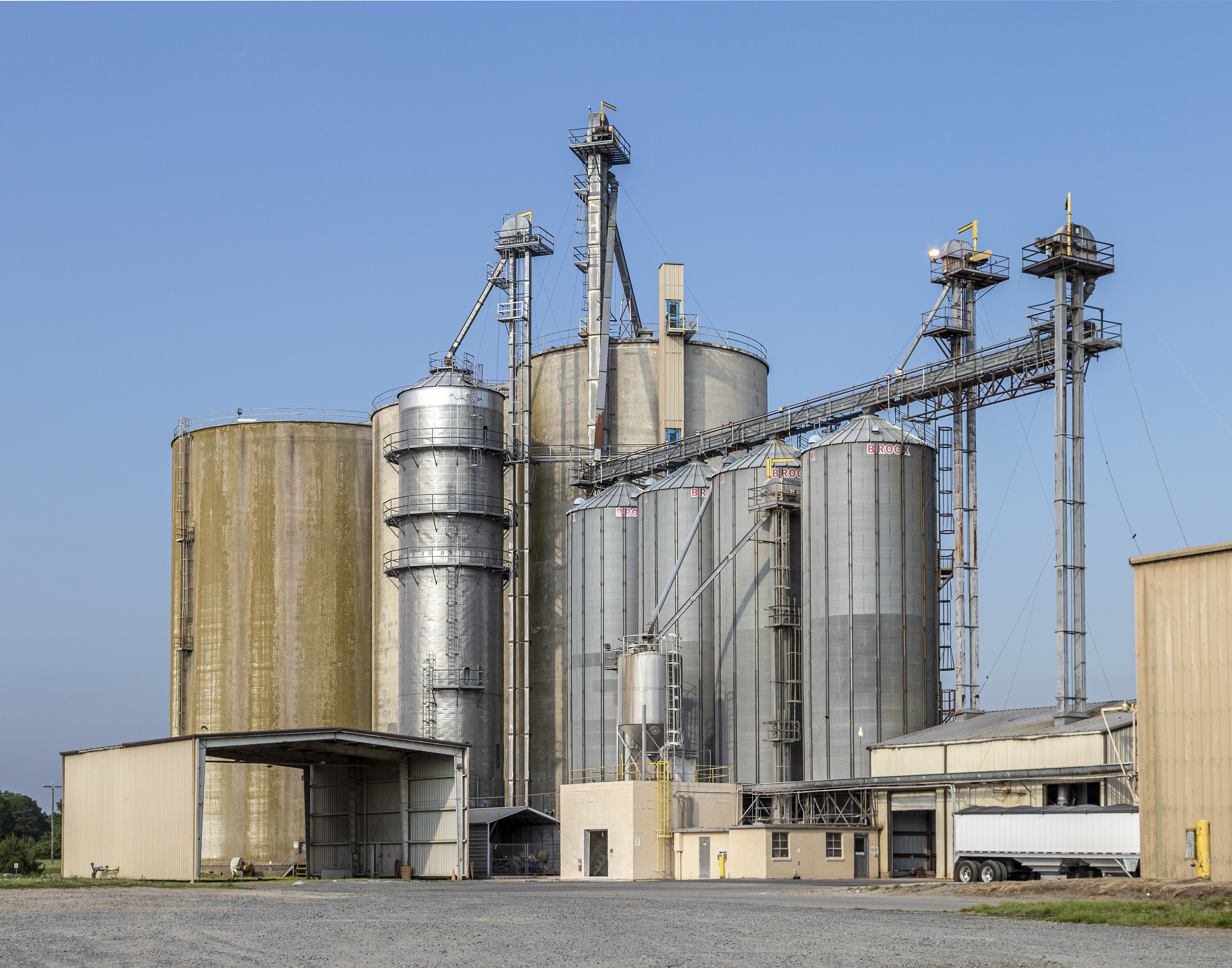
A grain elevator in Maryland

grain leg

A mechanism for hauling flowable bulk materials vertically, commonly grain as the central operation of a grain elevator. Modern grain legs typically consist of a pneumatic conveyor belt with attached bins or buckets which lift grain from an in-ground pit and carry it to the top of the leg, where the buckets tip as they rotate over the head drive wheel, spilling the grain into a system of pipes which distribute it by gravity or additional conveyors to grain bins for storage.
grain spear
An instrument used to measure the temperature and moisture content of stored grain, consisting of a thermometer and hygrometer attached to the end of a long rod which is pushed into the center of a bulk volume of the grain.
granary
A storage facility for threshed or husked grain.
grass-fed
Describing livestock such as cattle which have been raised exclusively on grass, pasture, or other forages (wild or cultivated), as opposed to being fed processed animal feeds.
grass sickness

A rare but often fatal neurological disease resulting in paralysis of the involuntary muscles of the digestive system, capable of affecting all ruminant mammals but especially equines such as horses, ponies, and donkeys. Symptoms include colic, patchy sweating, muscle wasting, dysphagia, and rapid weight loss. The exact cause remains unknown but the soil-borne bacterium Clostridium botulinum (responsible for botulism) has been suggested.
grazier

A person engaged in pastoral farming and the raising of grazing livestock. The term is used primarily in Australia and other former British Commonwealth territories, and has the same meaning as the North American term rancher.
grazing
1. A type of herbivory in which the herbivore feeds on grasses and other non-woody vegetation, as opposed to browsing, which involves feeding on taller trees and shrubs.
2. A method of animal husbandry which relies on this type of herbivory, whereby domestic livestock such as cattle are allowed to roam freely, often on wild pasture that is unsuitable for farming, in order to graze wild grasses and other forage.
grazing pressure
An animal-to-forage ratio expressed in terms of animal units grazing a particular area per unit weight of grazeable forage available in that area at any given moment.
grease wool
Wool recently shorn from a sheep, before any cleaning or processing.
green chop
Forage that is cut or harvested in the field while still green and succulent and then fed directly to livestock as fresh fodder (in contrast to hay and other types of feed which have been dried and stored). If wrapped and allowed to ferment, it can be made into silage.
green manure
Fresh or recently living plant material sourced from crop residues or even whole plants which is ploughed or tilled into the soil while still green (and usually when the plant tissues have reached peak maturity, often shortly after flowering and before developing seeds) so that it can serve as a mulch or an organic fertilizer. This is in contrast to brown manure, which consists of wilted or decayed plants that are simply left on the soil surface. Plants used for green manure are often cover crops grown specifically for this purpose and tilled into the same field in which a cash crop is subsequently cultivated.
Green Revolution

The dramatic increase in agricultural production that occurred worldwide during the second half of the 20th century, primarily due to the adoption of modern scientific methods of farming and large-scale management techniques; the development of high-yielding varieties of many crop plants (especially cereal grains); the expansion of irrigation infrastructures; the mechanization of many agricultural tasks with modern agricultural machinery; and the increase in the availability and use of chemical inputs such as fertilizers and pesticides, all of which led to a marked increase in production rates, farm yields, food quality and consistency, and crop prices in most parts of the world. The Green Revolution also accordingly led to an increase in land conversion and consolidation and the emergence of mass-market industrial agriculture, as well as to concerns about sustainability and the impact of agricultural practices on public health and the environment.
greenhouse

A building or structure designed to regulate the temperature and humidity of the environment inside, generally by having roofs and walls made of transparent panes of glass or plastic which permit sunlight to enter the interior but prevent heat from leaving it, effectively trapping solar energy inside and thereby heating the interior space to temperatures well above those of the outdoor environment. Thus greenhouses provide warm, sheltered environments where plants can grow even when the outdoor weather is cold and unsuitable, while still permitting enough sunlight for photosynthesis. This greenhouse effect is widely employed in agriculture and horticulture at many different scales (e.g. in cold frames and polytunnels) as a method of season extension or of controlled-environment agriculture. Greenhouses are usually designed to be easily ventilated (to prevent temperatures from increasing too much) and to supply or trap moisture as well as heat; in modern practice these systems are often fully automated.
greenweight

The total mass or weight of freshly harvested plant material, immediately following collection or cutting, before any moisture loss or drying occurs. Contrast dry weight.
grelinette
See broadfork.
grist
Grain that has been separated from its chaff in preparation for grinding in a mill; less commonly, the term is also used to describe grain after the process of grinding, i.e. grain that has already been ground.
gristmill
A mill that grinds grist (grain that has been separated from its chaff) into flour and middlings. The term may refer to either the grinding mechanism itself or the building that contains it.
groundcover
Wild or cultivated plants covering an area of land, thereby protecting the soil beneath from erosion and drought. See also cover crop.
growing degree-days (GDD)
growing season
The part of the year during which local weather conditions (i.e. temperature and precipitation) permit the normal growth of plants in a given location. Though the timing of plant growth and reproduction can vary widely by species, many plants adapted to the same environment show considerable phenological overlap, and so the term commonly refers to a single generic season that encompasses a majority of the plants or crops growing in a given location. In many places, the local "growing season" is defined as the period of time between the average date of the last frost (typically in the spring or early summer) and the average date of the first frost (typically in the autumn).

== H ==
hake bar
A coupling device which links a trailed plough to a tractor.
hardpan

Any dense, resistant layer of soil, usually found below the uppermost topsoil, that is difficult to dig or till and largely impervious to water and root growth. Hardpans can vary in thickness and depth below the surface; some form naturally from deposits such as silica that fuse and bind the soil particles, while others are human-made such as those caused by chronic soil compaction as a result of repeated ploughing, heavy traffic, or pollution.
harrow
A farm implement used to break up and smooth out the surface of a plot of soil. Harrowing often follows coarser ploughing, generally with the purpose of breaking up large lumps of soil so as to provide a better tilth that is suitable for use as a seedbed, and sometimes also to remove weeds or to cover seed after sowing.
harvest
1. To collect an agricultural product from a mature crop, a process known as harvesting.
2. The collected crop itself, considered as a whole; or the season in which harvesting occurs, generally marking the final phase of the agricultural cycle or growing season for the particular crop. The harvest is often the busiest time of year on a commercial farm.
harvest index
The weight of the harvested grain portion of a grain crop as a percentage of the total above-ground dry weight of the crop plants at maturity.
harvested acres
For a particular crop, the number of acres of cropland that are actually harvested, as opposed to planted but not harvested. At the national level, this statistic is usually lower than the total number of planted acres due to abandonment caused by weather damage or low market prices at some point during the growing season, or because the crop is repurposed for livestock grazing.
harvesting
The process of gathering a ripe crop from an agricultural area such as a field or greenhouse. Harvesting is often the most labor-intensive activity of the growing season or utilizes the most expensive and sophisticated implements or machinery. In general usage, the term may also include immediate postharvest practices such as cleaning, sorting, packing, cooling, and storing the gathered crops.
haulm
The stalks and stems left as residues by the harvesting of certain crops, especially peas, beans, and potatoes.
hay
Grasses, legumes, or other herbaceous plants that have been cut, dried, and stored as fodder for animals, especially livestock.
hay bucking
The manual labor of lifting and moving heavy bales of hay by hand, each usually weighing 50–150 pounds (23–68 kg), for the purpose of stacking them in a storage area or on the bed of a vehicle for transportation. The act of throwing bales up above one's head to stack them is called "bucking hay". This labor is notoriously strenuous and physically demanding. Teams of laborers often work together, wearing chaps and using hay hooks to handle the bales. The same task may also be accomplished mechanically with forklifts, balers, or powered elevators.
hay fever
Another name for allergic rhinitis, a type of inflammation predominantly in the nose and eyes resulting from an immune reaction to any of a wide variety of airborne allergens, including but not limited to pollen grains from grasses and other plants. The term is often used to describe the sudden onset of symptoms following inhalation of the dry particulate dust associated with manufacturing and handling hay, though it is now also used colloquially to refer to allergic reactions of any cause.
hay knife
A handheld agricultural tool consisting of a long-bladed knife, sometimes with a serrated edge, that is used for cutting or sawing through compact bundles, sheaves, or bales of hay or silage.
hay rake
A type of rake used to collect cut hay or straw into windrows for later collection (e.g. by a baler) and/or to "fluff up" the hay so that it dries more quickly.
hay steaming
A method of treating harvested hay by placing it in an airtight vessel and exposing it to high-temperature moisture, which dampens the respirable dust that occurs naturally in dried hay, preventing it from becoming airborne and thereby reducing its inhalation by humans and livestock, and also potentially killing bacterial or fungal spores which may be present.
hay-sweep
A handheld implement used to collect hay from swaths and carry it to a haystack.
haycock

A small pile of hay, uncompressed and left to dry in a field.
haylage
Silage with a high dry-matter content, made from the same grasses or legumes from which hay is made (such as alfalfa, timothy, and others) but not dried as much as hay nor as little as direct-chop/green-chop silage (before being ensiled).
hayloft

A storage area in the upper part of a barn or stable, used for storing hay or other fodder.
hayrack
hayseed
The seed of those grasses and legumes which are used for producing hay, especially when shaken from mown hay, and therefore sometimes inclusive of weed seed.
haystack

1. Another name for a stook or haycock, or more broadly for any pile of mown hay left in a field to dry, whether loosely stacked or bound and compacted.
2. A large number of sheaves or bales of dried hay stacked vertically one upon another, either manually or mechanically, for long-term storage. Methods of storing hay vary widely between different parts of the world, though in general they all have the same goals of keeping the hay dry and preventing spoilage. To this end haystacks are often constructed inside a barn or beneath a tarp, shelter, or moveable roof so as to protect them from the elements, and sometimes also on top of a wood or metal foundation rather than the bare ground. Small rectangular bales are stacked in a manner akin to bricklaying, overlapping or in a crisscrossed fashion, for structural stability.

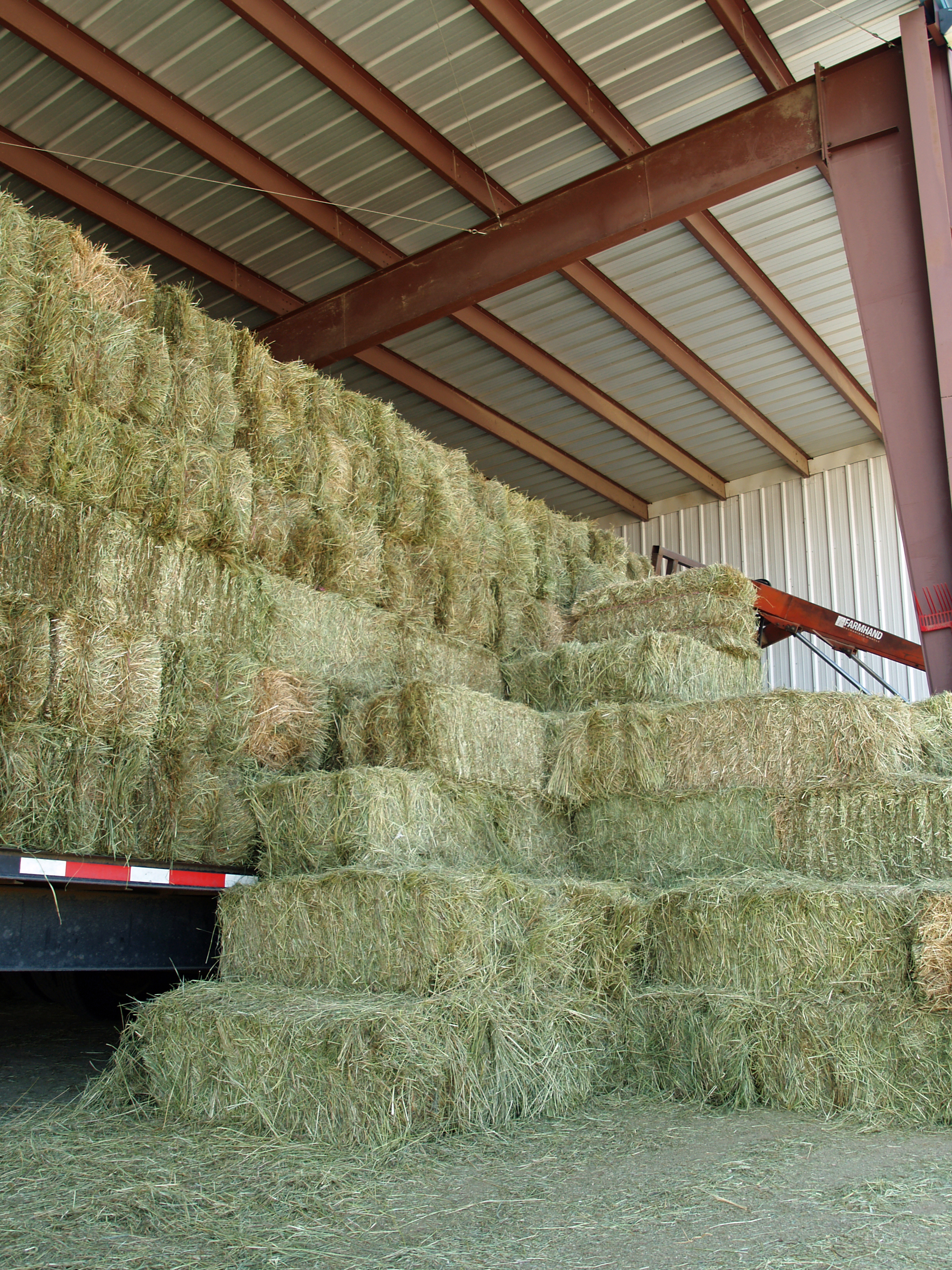
Rectangular bales of hay placed in a haystack for long-term storage

headland

A wide strip of land at each end of a planted field used for turning or maneuvering large farm machinery such as ploughs. The headland runs perpendicular to the lay of the field and may itself be planted at the beginning of the season; in such cases it is usually the first area to be harvested in order to minimize crop damage.
headrace
The part of a millrace that is upstream of the water wheel or turbine that drives the mill; the channel or sluice that conducts water from a water source to the mill. Compare tailrace.
hectare (ha)
A metric unit of area defined as the area of a square with sides of 100 by 100 metres (330 by 330 feet), equivalent to 10,000 square metres (0.003861 sq mi), or about 2.47 acres.
heifer
An adult cow that has not yet given birth to her first calf.
hefting
The process by which a flock of sheep becomes accustomed to one particular area within a larger pasture or rangeland, making individuals less likely to roam to distant areas and the flock easier to track and manage.
heirloom
A crop variety or cultivar whose unique characteristics and genetic diversity have been preserved by continuous cultivation for many generations, often on a small scale by traditional gardening or farming methods, unlike other cultivars grown in large-scale commercial agriculture. Heirloom plants are typically true-breeding and open-pollinated by natural mechanisms, and therefore must be grown in isolation from other cultivars of the same species to prevent them from hybridizing. Many heirloom varieties have been carefully maintained for centuries. Some agricultural organizations require that cultivars labeled "heirlooms" have a documented history of stewardship reflecting a distinct connection to a particular culture, family, or geographic area.
heliciculture
The cultivation of land snails with the goal of producing any of a variety of products that can be used by humans, usually food or cosmetics, or as a form of biological pest control.
hemerochory
The distribution by humans, intentionally or unintentionally, of cultivated plants or their seeds, cuttings, or propagules into habitats they have been unable to colonize through their natural mechanisms of spread, but in which they are nonetheless able to survive and propagate without additional support from human activities.
hen
1. A mature female chicken or other fowl.
2. A female lobster.
herbicide
A pesticide intended to kill or prevent the proliferation of unwanted plants such as weeds, by any of a wide variety of mechanisms. The most common herbicides are chemical substances which are applied directly to the foliage, stems, or roots of the target plant or to the soil or water around it. Selective herbicides are designed to be effective only against particular plant species or taxa, while leaving other plants such as agricultural crops relatively unharmed. By contrast, non-selective or broad-spectrum herbicides are capable of harming many or all types of plants, such that care must be taken when applying them so as to avoid harming valuable species. The use of chemical herbicides is a major aspect of weed control.
herbicide resistance
The development of a biological resistance to the deleterious effects of a herbicide, particularly in weeds or undesirable plants specifically targeted by and normally vulnerable to the herbicide. Such resistance is a common consequence of prolonged use of the same chemical formulation to control the same plant species, because doing so may artificially select for individual plants which express resistance traits.
herding

The act of gathering individual animals together into a group (known as a herd), maintaining the group as a unit, and/or moving the group from place to place. Many social animals, including cattle, sheep, and horses, naturally live in herds. Raising these animals as livestock involves a significant amount of time and energy managing and arranging herds, e.g. to separate animals by sex, breed, ownership, or medical status, or to move them between different grazing lands or to a marketplace.
hide
The skin of an animal, especially when removed from the animal and tanned or treated for human use, after which it is also known as leather. Domestic animals, particularly cattle, horses, sheep, and goats, are sometimes raised specifically for their hides.
high tunnel
See polytunnel.
high-yielding variety (HYV)
hill farming
A type of extensive agriculture practiced in hilly, upland areas unsuitable for intensive management, typically involving the grazing of livestock and especially sheep.
hilling

The piling of soil around the base of a plant, creating a small mound or ridge of earth, so as to aid plant growth in any of a variety of ways, often by improving retention of water or soil amendments.
hinny
A domestic hybrid equine that is the offspring of a male horse and a female donkey; i.e. the reciprocal cross to the mule.
hobby farm
A small farm or smallholding that is operated without the expectation of it being a primary source of food or income. Hobby farms may provide a secondary income or may be maintained for other reasons, e.g. in order to provide recreational land for people or animals, or simply for the pleasure of doing so, i.e. as a hobby or passion project.
hoe
A handheld tool or farm implement generally consisting of a flat, moderately sharpened metal blade, often square or pointed, that is attached at an acute angle to a long handle intended to be held with two hands. Hoes come in many shapes and sizes and are widely used in agriculture and horticulture for a huge variety of purposes, including digging, shaping, and tilling soil, removing weeds, harvesting crops by cutting stems or roots, and clearing the soil after harvest by burying or raking crop residues.
hog
Another name for a pig or domesticated swine, especially one weighing at least 120 pounds (54 kg) and being prepared for market.
hog off
To harvest a grain crop by allowing domestic pigs to eat it when the grain is nearly ripe, often because it is a poor crop that is not worth harvesting for market.
hogget
A domestic sheep between one and two years old that has not yet been sheared, or the meat or wool of such an animal.
hogging

The complete removal of the mane of a horse or pony by cutting, usually to keep the animal clean or for aesthetic reasons.
home-grown
Cultivated or produced locally, as with crops or livestock raised on one's own property (especially on land that also serves as the grower's place of residence, e.g. in a household garden), on a nearby farm, or in the same state or nation where they are offered for sale and consumption.
honey plant
Any plant used by bees as a source of nectar for making honey, especially one that imparts a distinctive flavor to the honey made from it. Examples include alfalfa, buckwheat, clover, goldenrod, mesquite, and sumac.
honey wagon
See manure spreader.
hoophouse
See polytunnel.
hop kiln
See oast.
hopper
A container with a hole at the bottom used to distribute bulk quantities of granular or particulate material by gravity at a consistent rate. Hoppers are employed in a wide variety of applications, commonly for sowing seeds; spreading granulated or pelletized fertilizers, pesticides, or other soil amendments; and feeding livestock.
horticulture
The cultivation of plants for any purpose, including for food, materials, and decoration. Horticulturists apply a variety of knowledge, skills, and technologies relevant to plant growth and propagation, typically in intensively managed gardens, in order to grow plants for subsistence purposes, for profit, for scientific research, or for personal or social needs.
hot dressed carcass weight
See dressed weight.
hotbed
An area of decaying organic matter (e.g. manure) that is warmer than its surroundings as a result of the decomposition of organic substances by microorganisms. Hotbeds enclosed by a small glass cover are often used as a kind of natural hothouse.
hothouse
A heated greenhouse.
humus
1. A characteristically dark-colored, nutrient-rich organic matter in soil formed by the decomposition of plants and animals; a topsoil horizon containing a large accumulation of organic carbon.
2. In agriculture, any natural compost gathered from a woodland or some spontaneous source and used as a soil amendment to aid crop nutrition and improve moisture retention.
3. The solid residues that are a byproduct of the sewage sludge treatment of wastewater, which are also sometimes composted and added to agricultural soils.
hundredweight (cwt)

A unit of weight or mass used in the United States and British Commonwealth territories and defined differently in each: the short hundredweight or cental, used in the U.S. customary system, is defined as exactly 100 pounds (45.4 kilograms), while the long or imperial hundredweight, used in the British imperial system, is defined as 112 pounds (50.8 kilograms). In agriculture, the weight of harvested crops or produce is sometimes reported in hundredweight.
husbandry
husk
The protective outer coating or shell of a seed, especially of a cereal grain such as wheat, or the leafy outer casing that surrounds an ear of maize. The husk is generally removed and discarded during the harvest by threshing, winnowing, or husking.
hutch
1. A small cage, pen, or enclosed coop, typically made of wood and wire, used for housing small animals such as rabbits, ferrets, or hamsters.
2. A small shelter with an attached outdoor enclosure used primarily in dairy farming to individually house a single pre-weaned calf or other small livestock animal so that ranchers can provide individualized animal care, reduce the animal's stress, or isolate animals in order to minimize the spread of infectious pathogens between them.
hybrid
An offspring resulting from sexual reproduction between parent organisms belonging to different breeds, strains, varieties, species, or genera, thereby combining different biological characteristics in a single organism. The traits of hybrids are often mixtures of their parents' traits or are intermediate between them, though they may also differ substantially from either parent, as with hybrid vigor.
hybrid vigor

Improved or increased size, strength, durability, yield, or any other biological function or quality in a hybrid offspring, relative to the same characteristics as observed in its parents.

Time-lapse of early growth of maize plants: two parent plants (left and right), each from a different inbred lineage, were crossed to produce hybrid offspring (center), which shows hybrid vigor not seen in either of the parents.

hydroponics

== I ==
idle land
Land that is arable, tillable, or generally in a condition suitable for the cultivation of agricultural crops without first requiring major modifications such as clearing of vegetation or rocks or drainage of water, but which nonetheless is not being cultivated, fallowed, or used as pasture.
in-bye
An area of enclosed land surrounded by a hedge or fence near a farmstead, most commonly used as permanent pasture. The term is used primarily in the United Kingdom, where it usually refers to relatively sheltered pasture below the more open moorland to which sheep or cattle may be moved for the winter or during inclement weather.
incubator
In the poultry industry, a heated space in which newly laid eggs are placed in order to keep them warm and sheltered prior to hatching, simulating natural avian incubation in a controlled environment at optimal temperature and humidity and sometimes featuring an automated mechanism capable of periodically turning the eggs as well.
indicator species
Any species whose natural (i.e. uncultivated) presence or status can reveal the qualitative health or condition of its local environment, often by suggesting the existence of one or more specific environmental characteristics, e.g. wetness, salinity, acidity, etc.
industrial agriculture
industrial crop

Any crop that is specifically grown in order to yield a useful product for human industrial processes, such as fuels, fibers, oils, rubber, chemicals, resins, waxes, or dyes; the term generally also includes energy crops.
input
insecticide
A pesticide intended to kill or incapacitate insects, either by targeting adult insects or by preventing the growth and development of insect eggs or larvae. Insecticides may be effective against a broad spectrum of different types of insects or may target particular species or taxa. In common usage, the term may also include pesticides intended for other kinds of arthropods which are not technically insects, such as mites and ticks. See also miticide.
intact
See entire.
integrated farming (IF)

A holistic approach to farming which combines traditional practices with modern tools and technologies in an effort to optimize both productivity and sustainability, ensuring a low environmental impact without compromising the quality or quantity of agricultural products. This philosophy views the farm and its surroundings as an intricately connected agroecosystem and integrates knowledge from numerous disciplines in order to match cultivation techniques as closely as possible to the demands of specific crops and to the farm's specific location and circumstances. Particular emphasis is placed on organic methods, efficient use of resources, careful management of soil integrity and fertility, attention to nutrient cycles, preservation of biodiversity, precision technologies, health and welfare of domestic animals, adherence to ethical criteria, and in general balancing all inputs and activities with the objectives of protecting the environment, maintaining economic profitability, and fulfilling social or cultural requirements.
intensive agriculture

Any system of agricultural production that uses relatively large inputs of labor, fertilizer, and/or capital per unit land area and is accordingly characterized by high production outputs, in contrast to extensive agriculture. In the developed world, most commercial agriculture is intensive in one or more ways.
intensive animal farming

An intensive approach to animal husbandry and the production of animal products such as meat, milk, and eggs, practiced at very large scales and intended to maximize productivity while minimizing expenses. It is generally characterized by raising very large numbers of livestock (e.g. cattle, pigs, poultry, and fish) simultaneously at high densities (e.g. on feedlots), using modern machinery to mechanize or automate agricultural tasks, and incorporating biotechnology methods (e.g. growth hormones) to increase yields, decrease production times, and prevent losses from pests and disease. Primarily practiced by corporate agribusinesses in the developed world, its outputs are often marketed globally and are major contributors to worldwide food surpluses, though it has also been criticized for environmental and ethical issues.
intercropping

A type of multiple cropping involving the cultivation of two or more crops in proximity, usually with the goal of producing a greater yield within a given area of land by making use of resources or ecological processes that would otherwise not be utilized by a single crop.

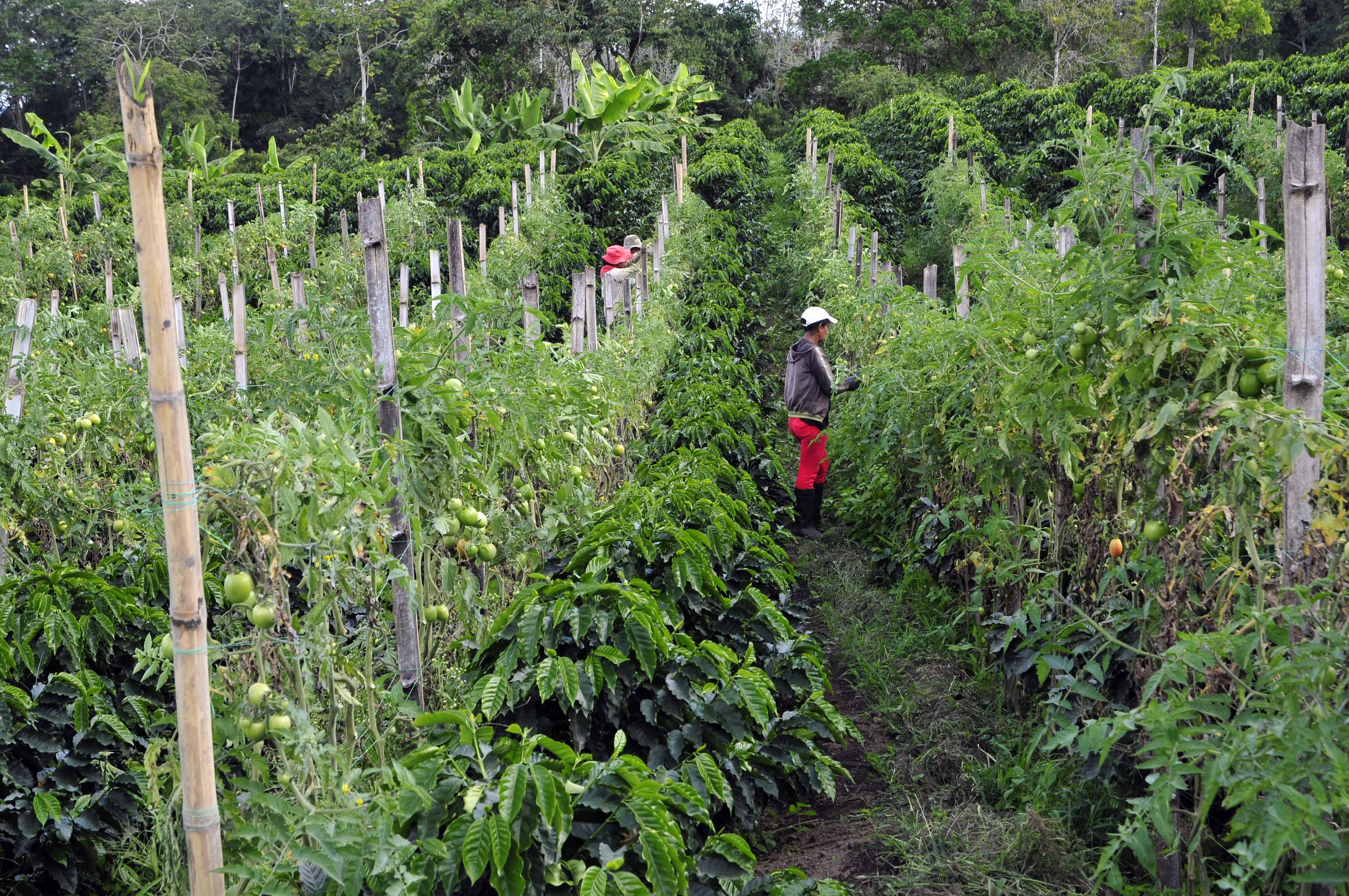
Alternating rows of coffee and tomatoes are intercropped on this farm in Colombia

irrigation
The application of controlled amounts of water to plants at needed intervals, especially for the purposes of growing agricultural crops, maintaining landscapes, or revegetating disturbed or drought-affected soils. Irrigation systems may also be used as a means of protecting crops from frost, suppressing the growth of weeds, preventing soil consolidation, providing water to livestock and keeping them cool in hot weather, and controlling airborne dust.

== J ==
jack
A male donkey.
jenny

A female donkey.

== K ==
kernel
The edible seed and the hard outer husk or shell of a cereal grain, especially wheat and maize; i.e. the whole grain of a cereal crop.
kid
A juvenile goat of either sex.
kidding
The process of giving birth in goats, by which a pregnant doe gives birth to a kid.

== L ==
lamb
1. A young sheep, usually less than one year old.
2. The meat from a young sheep less than one year old; or, in common usage, from a sheep of any age.
lairage
A holding pen or other accommodation where livestock are rested before slaughter, usually adjacent to a slaughterhouse, market, or port.
lambing
The process of giving birth in sheep, by which a pregnant ewe gives birth to a lamb.
land improvement
The process by which an area of land is altered from a natural or semi-natural state in order to make it usable for human purposes, e.g. to convert it into arable land for agriculture. Improvement for agricultural purposes typically involves extensive clearing of trees and other vegetation, removal of large rocks, tilling of soils, and/or flattening or terracing of the natural topography.
landrace
A traditional domesticated variety of a crop species that has become locally adapted over time to its specific natural and agricultural environment and has remained isolated from other wild and domesticated populations of the species. Landraces are often distinguished from cultivars and breeds in the standardized sense, although the term landrace breed is sometimes used when referring to cattle. Compare heirloom variety.
lard
A white, semi-solid fat product obtained by rendering the fatty tissue of swine, comparable to the tallow derived from cattle or sheep.
layer
A mature female chicken that lays eggs regularly. A good layer typically produces 200–250 eggs per year.
leaching
liming
The application of calcium- and magnesium-rich minerals (collectively known as lime) to soil, in any of a variety of forms, including marl, chalk, limestone, burnt lime, or hydrated lime, usually as a means of increasing soil pH. By acting as bases, these materials can help to neutralize very acidic soils, improving plant growth and increasing the activity of soil microbes. Structure liming can also improve aggregate stability in clay soils.
linear aeration
The process of aerating soil by applying organic matter or soil amendments directly to the soil surface (typically during fallow periods), then mechanically cutting long, narrow, linear grooves or channels into the soil profile to permit infiltration of the additives into the deeper layers of the soil, and finally recovering or refilling the grooves within the same operation. Linear aeration is employed in both gardens and lawns to aid penetration of fertilizers and soil softeners, to improve water retention, and to alleviate soil compaction in heavily traveled areas, while minimizing disturbances to soil structure.
lint
Ginned cotton, i.e. the fibers themselves after the seeds have been removed.
liquid manure
A mixture of animal faeces and various other organic matter such as crop residues, commonly aged in a slurry pit and then diluted with water, which is used as an agricultural fertilizer.
livestock
Any domesticated animals raised in an agricultural setting in order to produce labor and/or agricultural commodities such as meat, milk, eggs, fur, leather, and wool. In certain contexts the term may be used more narrowly to refer exclusively to animals that are bred for consumption, or only to farmed ruminants such as cattle and goats; sheep, pigs, and horses are also often considered livestock, while poultry and fish are usually excluded.
liveweight
The weight of a live animal prior to slaughter. The price paid for the meat of slaughtered animals is commonly based on either a liveweight or deadweight basis.
living mulch
A cover crop that is interplanted or undersown with a main crop in an agricultural field with the intention of filling the same role as ordinary mulch, namely weed suppression and regulation of soil temperature and moisture content. Whereas most cover crops are grown while the soil lies fallow and then buried or removed prior to planting a cash crop, living mulch is not removed and instead grown simultaneously with the cash crop.
lodging
The tendency of the normally erect stems of certain crop plants, especially cereal grains such as wheat, rye, and barley, to bend over and break near ground level and become flattened against the ground, which makes them very difficult to harvest and can dramatically reduce yield. Lodging is most commonly caused by adverse weather conditions such as heavy rainfall, hail, and strong winds, but may also occur due to trampling by animals.

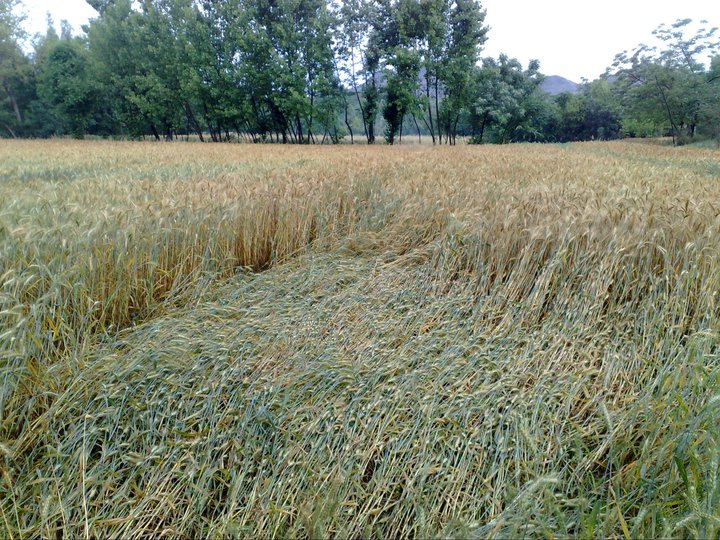
A wheat field where heavy rain and wind has caused lodging

lumber

Wood that has been processed into uniform sizes suitable for construction, carpentry, or other uses, particularly by sawing cut logs into dimensional boards, planks, beams, etc. which are either rough-sawn or smoothly surfaced on one or more faces. Lumber is referred to as "timber" in many parts of the world, though in the United States and Canada "timber" refers specifically to unprocessed wood in the form of cut logs or standing trees intended for logging.
lynchet

A type of agricultural terrace made from earth, or a strip of green, unploughed land left between two areas of ploughed land, often used to mark a temporary boundary between fields.

== M ==
magnanery
A building or property dedicated to sericulture, in which silk is cultivated and/or manufactured.
malt
The sprouted grain of a cereal which has been malted, or any product of the process of malting. The term may also refer more specifically to a viscous mixture of fermentable sugars extracted from the malted grain, rich in maltose, maltotriose, and maltodextrins, or to any of the various products which can be made with this extract, such as malt whisky and malted milk.
malt house

A building where cereal grain is converted into malt through the process of malting.
manger

A trough or bin used to hold animal fodder which permits animals to eat from it; or a structure or building containing such troughs, where numerous livestock are able to feed simultaneously.
manure
Any organic matter that is used as an organic fertilizer in agriculture, typically consisting of animal excreta, compost, and/or plant material. Manures contribute to soil fertility by adding organic compounds and nutrients such as nitrogen which are essential for plant growth and for the development of ecological networks with soil microorganisms.
manure spreader

A machine used to distribute manure over an agricultural field as fertilizer. Modern manure spreaders typically consist of a trailer towed behind a tractor with a conveyor and/or rotating mechanism driven by the tractor's power take-off.
marc
The solid residue that results from processing fruits, sugarcane, or sugar beets, and in particular from trampling and squeezing grapes or olives to extract juice. Marc residues have many uses, including as livestock feed.
mare
A mature female horse, donkey, or other equine animal.
mariculture
A specialized branch of aquaculture involving the cultivation of marine organisms in the open ocean, enclosed sections of the ocean, or saltwater tanks or raceways, with the goal of producing any of a variety of products that can be used by humans, most commonly foods but also non-food products such as jewellery and cosmetics. Mariculture includes the farming of marine fish, shellfish, molluscs such as clams and oysters, and seaweed, among many other organisms.
mash
A poultry feed consisting of a complete ration of ground grain, soybean meal, alfalfa meal, byproducts from meat processing, skimmed milk, limestone, salt, and/or fish oil, often fortified with vitamins and minerals.
mast
The fruit of forest trees and shrubs, e.g. acorns and nuts, especially when accumulated on the ground.
maternity pen
A warm, well-bedded enclosure in which pregnant animals about to give birth are kept isolated, preventing other animals from disturbing the mother or otherwise interfering with the birthing process.
matron
An adult female horse (a mare) that has given birth to a foal.
maverick
An unbranded calf, cow, or steer on open range, especially one separated from its mother.
meadow
An open field covered primarily by native grasses, herbs, and other vegetation, with few or no trees and shrubs. Meadows may occur naturally but may also be maintained or artificially created by humans for the production of hay or fodder or to serve as pasture for livestock.
mechanized agriculture

The use of agricultural machinery to mechanize the work of agriculture, thereby substantially increasing the productivity of an agricultural operation. Modern mechanized agriculture may make use of tractors, combine harvesters, aircraft, computers, and satellite imagery, among other technologies.
merchantable volume
In silviculture, the amount of wood in a tree or stand of trees (typically expressed in units of volume, e.g. board-feet) that is of a quality suitable for harvesting and marketing as lumber. The term is most commonly used to describe an estimated yield with respect to a particular economic context, which may vary as market conditions and consumer preferences change.
methyl viologen
See paraquat.
microbial inoculant
See soil inoculant.
micro-irrigation
Any method of irrigation that uses lower water pressures and volumes than traditional irrigation systems. Micro-irrigation champions the approach of distributing small volumes of water very slowly via small-gauge tubing or drip tape to precise points, often within or immediately above the plant's root zone, which allows time for water to penetrate slow-percolation soils rather than simply running off and minimizes the risk of overwatering.
middlings
See wheat middlings.
milk
A white liquid secreted by the mammary glands of female mammals, which serves as the primary source of nutrition for nursing infants before they are able to digest solid food. Milk is naturally rich in protein, fats, sugars, and many other nutrients. The collection of milk from various mammal species, including cattle, goats, sheep, water buffalo, yaks, camels, horses, and donkeys, among others, is the basis of the dairy industry.
milk cow
A cow kept primarily for the purpose of producing milk for home use or limited commercial sale, especially when belonging to a herd of cattle being raised for other purposes.
milking
The process of extracting milk, traditionally by hand but also by automated machine, from the mammary glands of lactating mammals, especially cattle, goats, sheep, and water buffalo, or more rarely camels, horses, or donkeys. Lactation occurs naturally in all sexually mature female mammals, though in usable quantities only during or immediately after pregnancy.

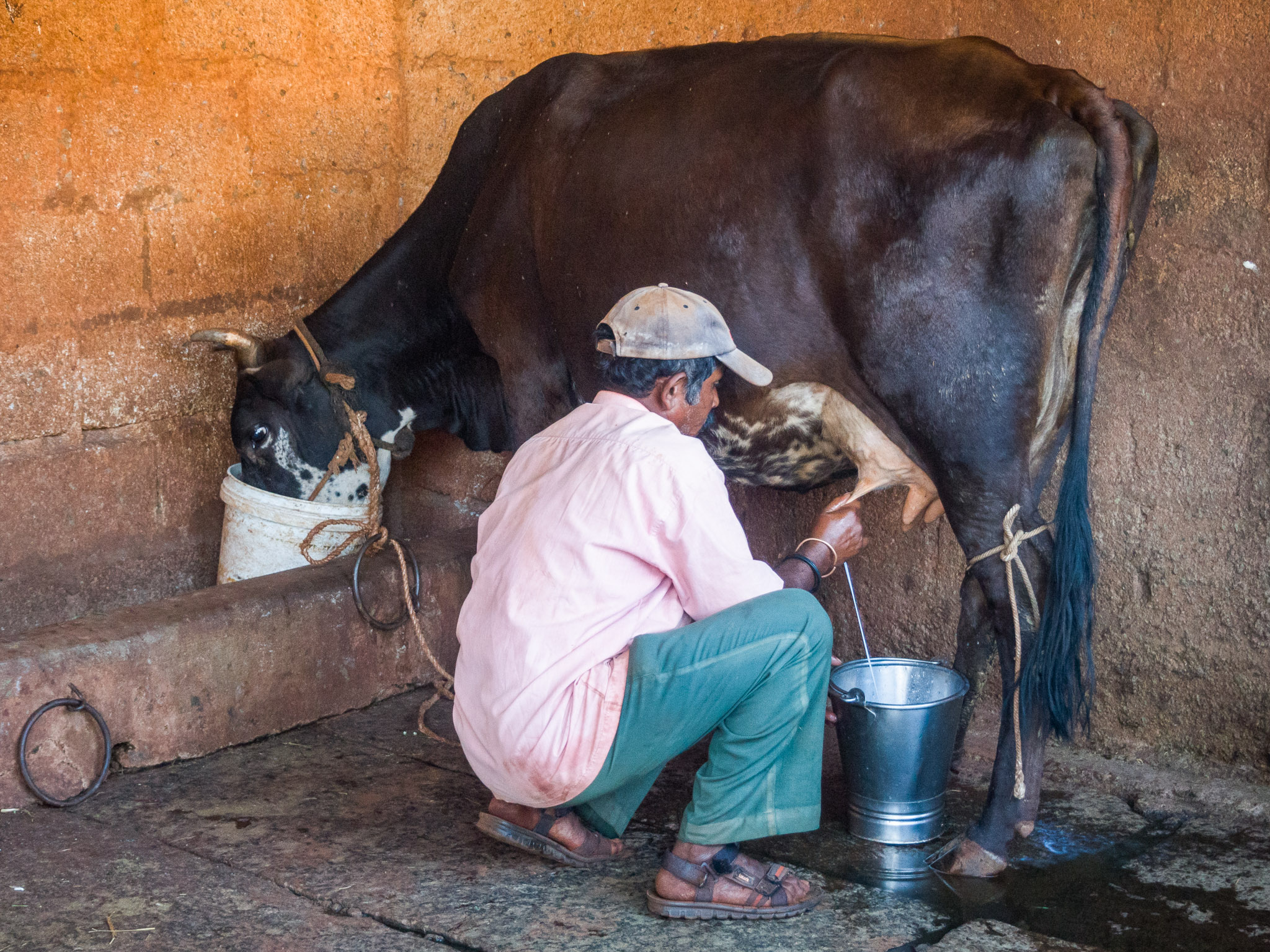
A cow being milked by hand

milking parlor
An enclosed, dedicated space where dairy animals are milked.
milkshed
A large rural area which produces most or all of the milk consumed in a particular place or by a particular population, by analogy with a watershed. See also foodshed.
mill
1. Any structure or device used to break solid materials into smaller pieces by grinding, crushing, or cutting, a process known as milling.
2. A business or factory which manufactures textiles by spinning, weaving, or knitting.
milling
The process of grinding, crushing, cutting, or pulverizing solid matter into smaller pieces, reducing the average particle size and often changing the shape and other physical properties as well; or the process of breaking down, separating, sorting, grading, or classifying aggregate material into particles of uniform size. Milling is an important primary operation in the postharvest processing of many agricultural crops, mainly cereal grains and pseudocereals. Historically mills were powered manually or with draft animals such as oxen, horses, or donkeys, or by the force of the wind or the flow of water, though in modern contexts they are usually electrically powered.
millrace

The current of flowing water that turns a water wheel, or the channel or sluice that carries this water. A millrace is usually a man-made conduit or ditch that delivers a narrow, rapid, and powerful stream from a reservoir such as a mill pond or diverts it from a natural watercourse such as a river, with the force generated by the flow used to power a turbine or mill. The part of the millrace that is upstream of the water wheel is called the headrace, while the part downstream of the wheel is the tailrace.
minimum tillage
A type of conservation tillage designed to conserve soil quality by minimizing the amount of soil manipulation necessary for successful crop production, typically by completely avoiding primary tillage and practicing only minimal secondary tillage.
minor crop
A crop plant that is high in value but is not widely grown. Many fruits, vegetables, and tree nuts may be considered minor crops.
miticide
See acaricide.
mixed farming
The simultaneous cultivation of crops and raising of livestock for meat, eggs, or milk on the same farm, especially on the same or adjacent lands, and often reusing or recycling the products of one operation to supply the other, e.g. by using some part of the crop harvest for animal fodder, or by using animal manure as a crop fertilizer.
monocropping

The practice of cultivating a single crop species repeatedly on the same land for many consecutive growing seasons. Monocropping allows farmers to optimize their time and labor by applying the same inputs, growing methods, machinery, pest controls, etc. to the same crop in the same spaces year after year, but also forgoes the potential benefits of natural diversity and may eventually prove unsustainable by exhausting soil nutrients and requiring increasingly large inputs to compensate.
monoculture
The practice of growing or raising a single crop or livestock species, variety, or breed on a particular area of land at a time. Contrast polyculture.
mote
Waste material from the cotton ginning process, primarily from lint cleaning.
mouldboard
A curved blade or plate attached to a plough or bulldozer which lifts and at least partially overturns soil and/or pushes it to the side. Mouldboard ploughs generally have a flat bottom spanning the entire width of the tillage zone and may reach depths of 100 to 200 millimetres (4 to 8 in) below the surface.
mouthing
The process of inspecting an animal's teeth to determine its age, as is commonly done with sheep and horses.
mulch
Any layer of material applied to the surface of soil for the purpose of conserving soil moisture, improving soil health and fertility, reducing weed growth, and/or enhancing the soil's aesthetic appeal. Mulches are usually organic in nature (e.g. bark chips, manure, and compost) though plastic sheeting and other types of artificial mulch are also common.
mule
A domestic hybrid equine that is the offspring of a female horse and a male donkey; i.e. the reciprocal cross to the hinny.
muley
A polled cow.
multigerm seed
Any type of seed product sold as a cluster of seeds fused together and which produces more than one plant when it germinates, after which the multiple plants are typically reduced to individual plants by a process called singling.
multiple cropping
The practice of growing two or more crops on the same area of land in the same growing season (as opposed to growing only one crop); the crops may be harvested at the same time or at different times. It is a form of polyculture. See also companion planting.
mustering
See herding.
mutton
1. The meat from an adult sheep more than one year old. See also lamb.
2. A castrated male goat.

== N ==
nanny goat
See doe.
naps
Large, tangled masses of cotton fibers present in ginned cotton, often a consequence of ginning cotton which has not dried sufficiently. Compare neps.
natural growth promoter (NGP)
neps
Very small, snarled or knotted clusters of cotton fibers present in ginned cotton which are difficult to detect, looking like dots or specks in the lint, and equally difficult to remove. Neps are generally a more serious concern than naps because if not detected they will appear as defects in the finished yarn or fabric.
net farm income
The return, both monetary and non-monetary, to farm operators for their labor, management, and capital, after all production expenses have been paid; i.e. gross farm income minus production expenses. It includes net income from sales of the farm's agricultural products as well as net income attributed to the rental value of farm dwellings, the value of any commodities consumed on the farm, depreciation, and inventory changes. The term is used primarily in United States agricultural policy.
neutering

The surgical removal of all or most of the reproductive organ(s) of an animal, male or female, usually with the goal of irreversibly sterilizing the animal by eliminating sex organs which are essential to its ability to reproduce. In the broadest sense the term may also encompass non-surgical methods of sterilization such as those that employ pharmaceutical drugs, which may or may not be reversible. The male-specific term for neutering is castration and the female-specific term is spaying, though colloquially "neutering" may be used interchangeably with both. An animal that has not been neutered is said to be intact or entire.
non-program crop
Any agricultural crop or commodity not covered by a federally funded commodity program. Contrast program crop.
northern vigor
The phenomenon by which certain varieties of plants adapted to high-latitude climates produce hardier, better-tasting, or higher-yield crops when grown in lower-latitude climates. The effect has been observed in many types of produce grown in the northern United States and Canada, including potatoes, strawberries, and garlic.
no-till farming
Any method of growing crops or maintaining pasture without disturbing the soil through tillage, and typically involving minimal or no seedbed preparation. Proponents assert that in certain contexts no-till or low-till techniques can increase the soil's retention of water and organic matter and reduce soil erosion.
noxious weed
A weed or other undesirable plant that is not merely a nuisance but actually harmful to cultivated crops or other useful plants (by acting as a parasitic plant, strongly outcompeting other plants, or releasing allelopathic chemicals into the soil) or to humans or domestic animals such as livestock (by poisoning or causing other injury). Many places specify which weeds are noxious and require land users to take steps to control these species.
NPK
nurse cow
A cow which is milked in order to supply milk to nursing calves other than her own.
nurse crop
Any annual crop plant used to assist in the establishment of a perennial crop. Nurse crops may help to reduce the incidence of weeds, prevent soil erosion, and shade the perennial crop's seedlings from excessive sunlight; often the nurse crop itself is harvested for a particular product.
nursery
1. Any place, often sheltered and irrigated, where plants are cultivated from seed, cuttings, grafts, or some other propagule and young plants are raised until they are mature enough to be transplanted, or to serve as a source of vegetative clones, rootstock, or grafting stock, either for the grower's own use or for commercial sale.
2. A building designed and maintained specifically for raising young animals, especially calves or piglets.

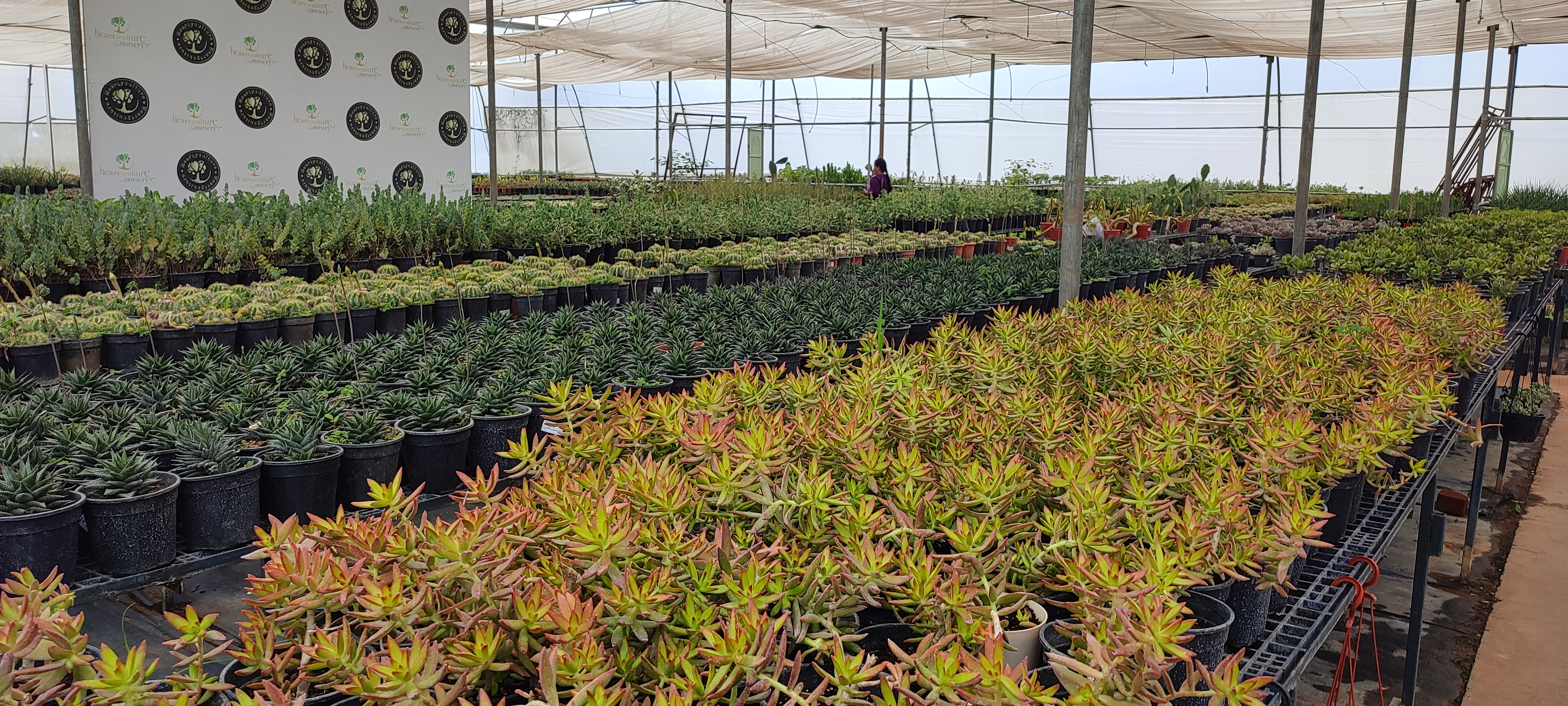
Young plants being raised in pots in a nursery in India

nutrient pollution
The contamination, particularly of surface water sources, by excessive inputs of nutrients such as nitrogen and phosphorus. Sources of nutrient pollution include surface runoff from agricultural fields and pastures (where large quantities of nutrient-rich fertilizers are commonly applied), discharges from septic tanks and feedlots, and emissions from combustion.

== O ==
oast

A building designed for kilning or drying harvested hops for use in the brewing of beer.
off-farm stocks
Harvested whole grains or oilseeds produced by a particular farm or agricultural operation which have been removed from the farm where they were produced and stored off-site in temporary or permanent storage, e.g. at grain elevators, mills, or other processing facilities, regardless of their ownership or intended use. This includes supplies of grain which have been sold or distributed to consumers or retailers as well as supplies which have not yet been sold but for which there is no available storage space on the farmer's property. Compare on-farm stocks.
oilseed crop
Any plant crop cultivated specifically for the edible and/or inedible oils that can be extracted from its seeds, which may be used in cooking or in certain non-food products; the non-oil byproducts are also commonly used to produce high-protein animal feed. Examples of oilseed crops include soybeans, peanuts, cottonseed, flaxseed, canola, sunflower seeds, and safflower seeds.
olericulture
The cultivation of vegetables (i.e. non-woody herbaceous plants) for food, or the science that studies the growing of these plants as edible produce.
once grown seed
Seed obtained from plants that have been grown from a certified seed intended for use only by the farmer on his own farm, and not for resale.
once-over tillage
An operation in which a field is tilled and planted simultaneously or in quick succession.
on-farm stocks
Harvested whole grains or oilseeds which are stored on-site in temporary or permanent storage at or near the same farm where they were grown, regardless of their ownership or intended use. This includes supplies of grain which have already been sold but not yet distributed to consumers or retailers as well as supplies kept for the farmer's own use, and in the broadest sense may also include grain which is still growing in the field and has not yet been harvested. Compare off-farm stocks.
on-the-hoof
(of livestock) Sold live for slaughter.
open
(of livestock) Fertile but not yet pregnant; able to be impregnated.
open range
A type of rangeland on which livestock, particularly cattle, roam freely regardless of land ownership and without being enclosed by fences. Where open range is prescribed by law, the land owner (and not the animal owner) is responsible for erecting exclosure fences to keep animals off of private or public property.
orchard
Any intentional planting of trees or shrubs that is maintained for food production. Most orchards are planted with a single variety of fruit- or nut-producing tree, and are often laid out in a regular grid with wide spacing and grazed or mown grass or bare soil between individual trees to make maintenance and harvesting easy.
orchardry
The cultivation of trees or shrubs in an orchard, with the goal of producing any of a variety of products that can be used by humans, especially foods.
organic farming

An agricultural production system which excludes or eschews the use of synthetic chemical compounds (particularly fertilizers, pesticides, and herbicides for plant crops, and growth hormones, antibiotics, and synthetic feed additives for livestock production) and instead emphasizes the use of naturally occurring, organic substances and alternative methods for solving the problems of agriculture, including crop rotation, companion planting and polyculture, permaculture, natural fertilizers such as manure and field residues, beneficial microbes, trap crops, biological pest controls, etc. Organic production usually prohibits the use of genetically modified organisms and sometimes mechanized farm equipment as well. In many places the label "organic" has a specific legal meaning and its use may require certification, whereby certified organic farms must adhere to national organic production standards. Many organic methods are also core elements of sustainable agriculture, though whether or not organic methods actually affect the environment and human health in more positive ways than conventional methods is disputed.
organic fertilizer

Any fertilizer made from non-synthetic, naturally occurring substances, often compost or plant and animal products such as crop residues or manure. This is in contrast to many large-scale commercial fertilizers which contain synthetic chemical compounds. Use of organic fertilizers is widely practiced in organic agriculture.
orthodox seed
Seeds which can survive long periods of time in storage and still retain their viability to germinate, especially those capable of tolerating the effects of drying or freezing (generally, temperatures less than 10 °C (50 °F)). Orthodox seeds can be dried to a very low internal moisture content. Contrast recalcitrant seed.
outbuilding
Any building that is part of an agricultural or residential complex but is detached or distant from other structures, especially one dedicated to some practical purpose and isolated by necessity or convenience on a remote part of a large property. Common agricultural outbuildings include barns, stables, cellars, silos, granaries, sheds, and housing for farm laborers.
outfarm
A cluster of outbuildings located near outlying fields or pastures which are distant or isolated from a primary farmstead, providing facilities for agricultural operations in remote areas of a very large farm or ranch.
out-wintering
The practice of keeping livestock (especially cattle) outdoors on pastureland during the winter, leaving them to fend for themselves for protection from the elements, rather than housing them in an indoor shelter.
overcropping
The practice of growing too many crops on the same land in the same growing season, which may reduce yield for any of a variety of reasons, usually because soil fertility is insufficient to support multiple cropping or repeated growing cycles without periodic fallowing.
overgrazing
Excessive or intensive grazing by livestock of the same pasture or food source for extended periods of time, or without sufficient recovery of vegetation or soils during the intervals between grazing periods. Poor livestock management often results in overgrazing, though it may also be caused by wild animals that are restricted from traveling due to man-made obstacles such as fences.
ox

A bovine animal of either sex which is trained and used as a draft animal, especially for plowing, threshing, milling, pulling carts or wagons, or hauling loads. Oxen are most commonly castrated adult male cattle, though cows and intact males may also be employed as oxen.

== P ==
packinghouse
A building in which harvested agricultural produce (e.g. fruits and vegetables) is packaged for sale prior to distribution to market. Other forms of postharvest processing such as cleaning may also take place in the same facility.
paddy farming
A form of wet-field agriculture in which semiaquatic plants such as rice and taro are grown in soils inundated in shallow pools of water, generally 10–15 centimetres (3.9–5.9 in) in depth, for most or all of the growing cycle. Most plants cannot survive in these conditions, but rice is specially adapted to supply oxygen to its lower parts even when fully submersed. Paddy fields involve huge quantities of water and so are most common in humid wetlands such as in many parts of East Asia. It remains the dominant method of rice farming in modern times.

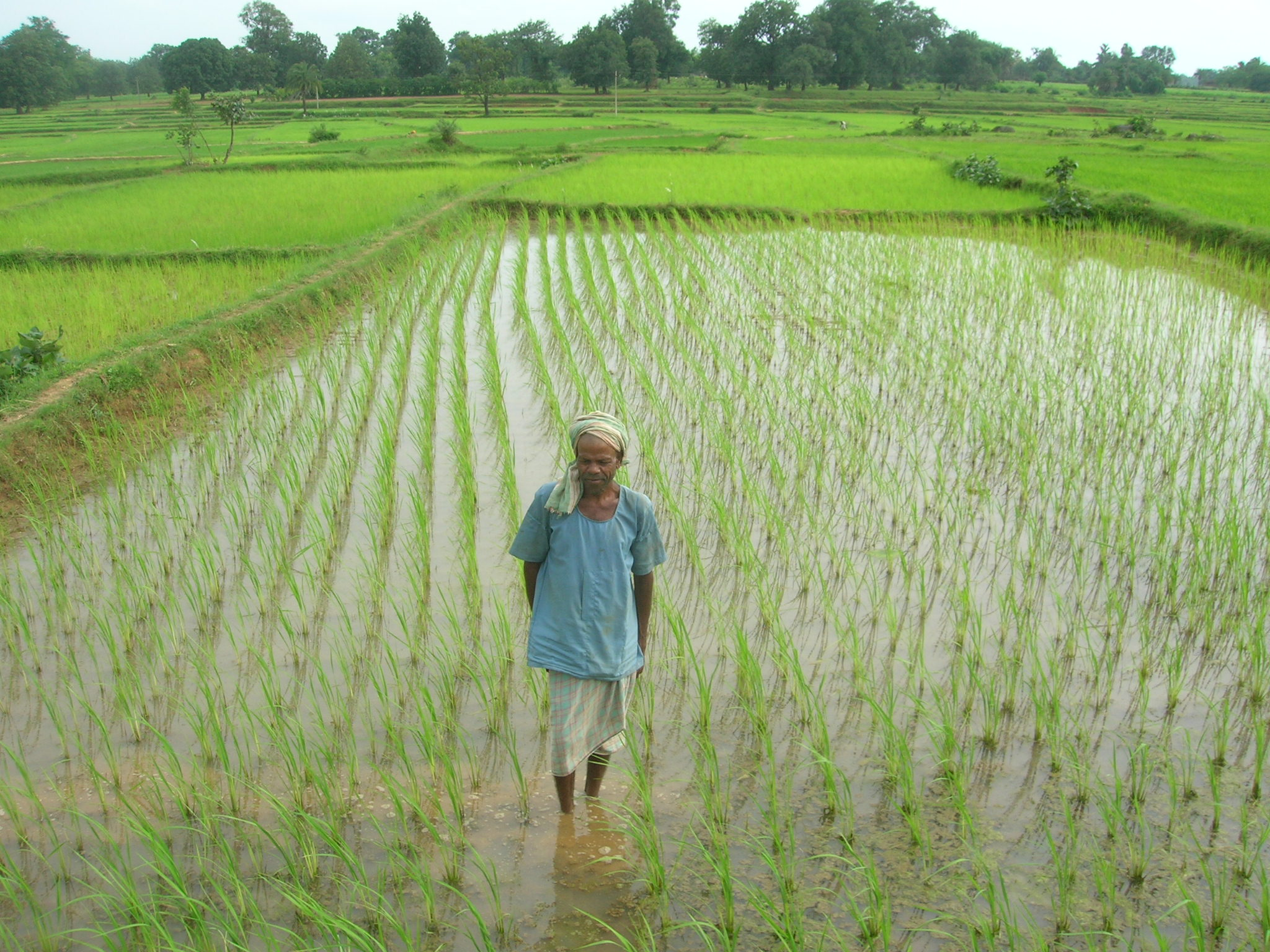
Rice paddies

paddy field

A flooded field of arable land used for growing semiaquatic crops such as rice and taro.
paludiculture
A form of wet agriculture that involves rewetting drained peat soils in order to maintain carbon storage and thus minimize greenhouse gas emissions and subsidence in peatlands, practiced as a sustainable alternative to conventional drainage-based farming methods such as rice paddies.
pannage
The practice of releasing livestock, especially pigs, into a wild forest so that they can feed on fallen mast such as acorns, beechnuts, and chestnuts.
paraquat

An organic compound once widely used as a quick-acting, broad-spectrum herbicide for its ability to act as a defoliant by non-selectively killing green leaves and stems. It is rapidly decomposed in soil (and so has little effect on roots) but is highly toxic to mammals, and thus its use is now prohibited or restricted in many countries, where it has largely been replaced by glyphosate.
pasteurization
The practice of applying moderate heat to milk and other heat-sensitive liquids in order to reduce the native microbial load. Pasteurization uses temperatures which are much lower than in conventional sterilization techniques but still high enough to deactivate or denature the proteins and other molecules used by bacteria and other microorganisms, usually not killing them outright but significantly slowing their growth and reproduction, thereby delaying the inevitable onset of spoilage and extending the product's shelf-life.
pastoral farming

A sedentary form of pastoralism in which livestock are raised on the same pastureland for most or all of their lives, rather than continuously being moved as in traditional nomadic pastoralism. Pastoral farmers typically have some form of ownership of the land they use, giving them an economic incentive to improve the land to meet the needs of their animals (e.g. by irrigation).
pastoralism
A type of animal husbandry in which herds of domestic animals are released onto large areas of vegetated outdoor land, known as pastures, for grazing, traditionally by fully or partially nomadic peoples who move around with their herds, and generally in places where environmental conditions such as aridity, poor soils, and extreme temperatures make growing crops difficult or impossible.
pasture
Any land used for grazing, especially enclosed tracts of farmland grazed by domesticated livestock such as horses, cattle, sheep, or swine. Pasture vegetation mainly consists of grasses and forbs and is typically grazed throughout the summer. Pasture is often distinguished from, but may in the broadest sense include, other agricultural land types such as meadows, rangelands, or other unenclosed pastoral areas.
pastureland
A type of agricultural land used as pasture for grazing animals.
patch
A relatively small cultivated area with only one type of crop growing in it, e.g. a pumpkin patch or onion patch.
pegging
A developmental stage of the peanut plant in which a fertilized flower produces an elongated ovary which enters the soil and develops underground into a pod and eventually a peanut.
pellet mill

A type of mill or machine press used to compress and mold bulk quantities of powdered or fine-grained material into compact, high-density, homogeneous units called pellets, which are often much easier to store, transport, and distribute than in their original form. Many agricultural materials are commonly pelletized, including fertilizers and pesticides. Compound animal feed is usually milled from a feed mixture into small pellets the size of a kernel of corn so as to ensure a uniform ration for each fed animal.
perishable
Describing an agricultural product, particularly a food, that is vulnerable to natural processes of decomposition and decay within a relatively short time after being harvested or sold to a consumer (usually a few days or weeks), such that the product gradually spoils or rots, irreversibly losing the structure, consistency, flavor, nutritional value, and/or other qualities characteristic of its fresh form. In the absence of specific treatments, virtually all raw foods eventually succumb to these processes via chemical reactions with their environment, both biotic (e.g. decomposition by microorganisms such as bacteria and fungi) and abiotic (e.g. dehydration by atmospheric evaporation), though some foods decay faster than others. Many methods of food processing and preservation have been developed to prevent or delay decomposition in order to make foods usable or marketable for longer periods. These range from storage in cold, dry, or oxygen-poor environments (all of which can greatly reduce the rate of microbial growth) to pasteurization or treatment with protective waxes or preservatives. The most perishable foods are generally those for which preservation is difficult or undesirable, especially fresh produce such as fruits and vegetables, but also animal meat. Commercial foods sold in a cooked, canned, or highly processed form may be considered "non-perishable" for the purpose of calculating shelf life or expiration dates.
perlite
An amorphous glass mineral of volcanic origin with a relatively high water content and the unusual property of expanding to many times its original volume when heated sufficiently. Expanded perlite is commonly used as a soil amendment in horticulture, where its low density and high permeability help to improve drainage and prevent soil compaction. It is also sometimes used alone as a growth medium for starting cuttings or in hydroponics.
permaculture
An approach to land management that adopts arrangements observed in healthy natural ecosystems, with particular emphasis on utilizing creative design principles derived from whole systems thinking. Permaculture principles are often employed in regenerative agriculture, rewilding, and sustainable agriculture, but the concept has a wide range of applications, including in ecological engineering, water resource management, and architecture.
permanent crop
Any crop produced from a perennial plant which produces crops repeatedly over multiple seasons, rather than having to be replanted after each harvest.
permanent wilting point (PWP)

pesticide
Any chemical or biological agent used to deter, incapacitate, kill, sterilize, or otherwise discourage the activity or proliferation of one or more target organisms considered pests by humans, which includes herbicides used to control noxious plants, insecticides, miticides, fungicides, nematicides, antimicrobials for bacteria and viruses, and any other substance intended to control a pathogen of any kind. Pesticides are widely used in agriculture to protect crop plants or domestic animals from pathogens which may cause or transmit disease or destroy crop value, though they are also used for a huge variety of other purposes. Some are applied directly to the pest, while others are applied to the crop or animal itself, or to the air or soil around it. Pesticide use may also have drawbacks, including unintended or off-target effects such as toxicity to humans.
pesticide refuge
pharming

The use of genetic engineering technologies to insert one or more genes encoding useful pharmaceuticals into a host plant or animal that would otherwise not express those genes, thereby creating a genetically modified organism. Crops modified in this way are sometimes called pharma crops.
picking
The harvesting of fruit or vegetable crops by removing, by hand or machine, the fruits or vegetables from the plants, as with apples and berries.
pig

A domestic swine of either sex, especially a member of the species Sus domesticus, often considered a domesticated subspecies of the wild boar, Sus scrofa.
piglet
A young domestic pig of either sex. See also farrow.
pigsty
See sty.
pineapple pit
A method of cultivating pineapples in temperate climates, consisting of a trench dug into the ground and covered with transparent glass, with two internal walls dividing it into three troughs. Pineapples are grown in the central trough while the outer troughs are filled with fresh manure, which gives off heat as it decomposes, keeping the central trough warm and humid.
pinery
1. A natural or cultivated pine forest which is harvested for timber.
2. A plantation where pineapples are grown, or another name for a pineapple pit.
pioneer crop
A crop grown to improve the general fertility of a parcel of land prior to sowing another, typically more valuable crop on the same land. Farmers often permit livestock to graze the pioneer crop in the hope that their dung will add soil nutrients.
pisciculture

A branch of aquaculture involving the raising of fish in tanks, enclosures, or hatcheries with the goal of producing any of a variety of products that can be used by humans, most commonly food.
pitchfork
A two-handed agricultural tool with between two and five long, thin tines and a long handle, used to efficiently pitch or toss large clumps of loose material such as hay, straw, leaves, or manure. Pitchforks are used for a wide variety of tasks such as feeding cattle and bucking hay.

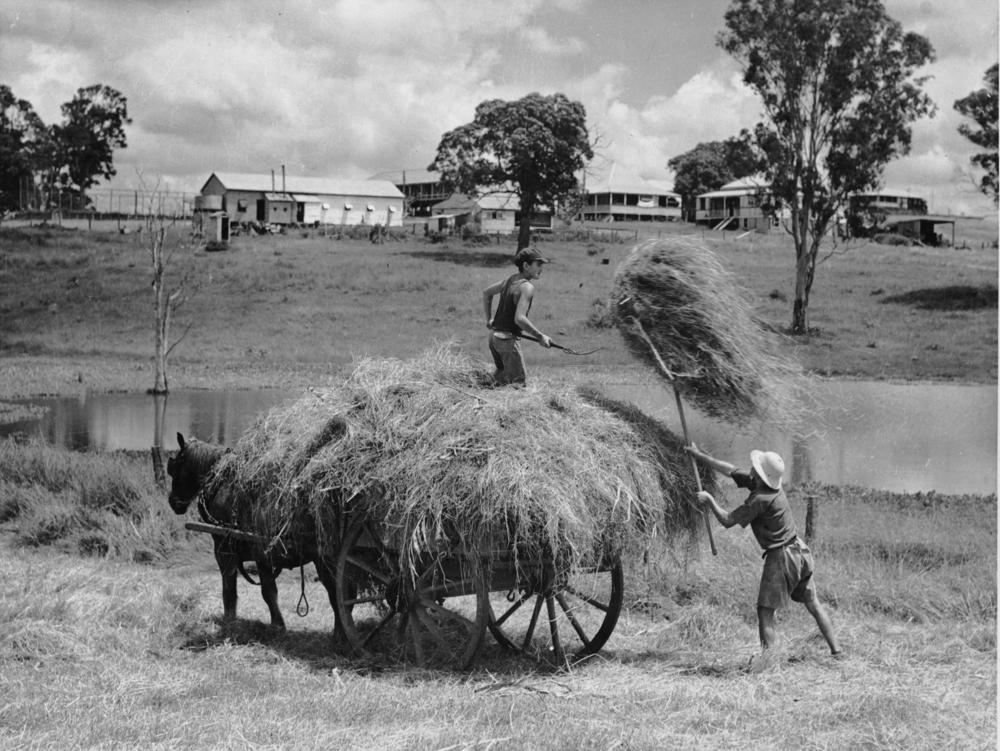
People using pitchforks to "pitch" or load hay onto a wagon

pitting
The intentional digging of shallow pits or basins of suitable capacity and distribution throughout large, flat areas of farmland or rangeland in order to reduce the overland flow of surface runoff from excessive rainfall or snowmelt.
plant breeding
The deliberate and systematic reproduction of plants in agriculture and horticulture, typically involving the artificial selection of which individual plants will breed in order to produce progeny with desirable characteristics.
plantation
A large-scale estate which specializes in farming cash crops, most commonly cotton, coffee, tea, cocoa, sugar cane, opium, fruit trees, rubber trees, and forest trees.
plashing
See pleaching.
plastic mulch
An artificial mulch consisting of a thin film of plastic polymers, used in both crop production and landscaping for the same reasons as natural mulches, i.e. to suppress weeds, conserve water, and maintain soil integrity. Crops grow through regularly spaced holes cut in the plastic film. It is most commonly used with row crops, often in conjunction with drip irrigation.
plasticulture
The use of plastic materials in agricultural applications. Plastics are used for a huge variety of purposes in all types of agriculture, including as irrigation drip tape, row covers, plastic mulch, bale wrap and postharvest packaging, polytunnels, and feed troughs, among numerous others.
pleaching

The practice of interweaving the living and dead branches of a hedgerow so that they become tangled, either for the purpose of strengthening the hedge by forming a natural fence or wall which continues to thicken as it grows, or for ornamental reasons.
plough

Any farm implement used to loosen or overturn soil in preparation for sowing seed or transplanting, a practice known as ploughing. Ploughs typically consist of a series of blades attached to a wooden or metallic frame, often with wheels, which is then pushed or pulled either by humans, by draft animals, or, on modern farms, with a tractor.
plough pan

A hard layer in the subsoil caused by excessive compression due to repeated ploughing at the same depth over multiple consecutive seasons. See also hardpan.
plough planting

A reduced-tillage system in which a planting or seeding apparatus is mounted directly behind a plough such that a field is ploughed and sown simultaneously in a single step, with no intervening secondary tillage. See also once-over tillage.
plough-to-plate
See farm-to-fork.
ploughing

The use of a plough in the cultivation of agricultural land. Ploughing is an ancient and fundamental agricultural technique, the primary purpose of which is to evenly distribute fresh nutrients, moisture, and air through the uppermost layers of the soil while also burying weeds and crop residues to decay. Modern ploughed fields are typically left to dry and then harrowed prior to planting. The use of a plough usually leaves the soil with a rough, unfinished look and parallel trenches called furrows; conventional, intensive ploughing practices may contribute to soil erosion and the formation of hardpan.
ploughshare

The large metal blade that is the leading edge of the mouldboard of a plough, used to cut through large amounts of soil to the bottom of the furrow. Certain ploughs have a coulter immediately preceding the ploughshare.
plug
In horticulture, a juvenile plant, seedling, or cutting germinated and grown individually in a very small container filled with a small amount of potting soil or other growth medium, with the intention of transplanting it into a larger container or into the ground after it has grown to a certain size (at which point the soil or growth medium is held together by the plant's roots, allowing it to be easily removed from the starting container). Plug plants are often grown by commercial nurseries in large numbers in portable seed starter trays under controlled conditions, which makes it convenient to manage numerous plants during the early stages of growth and to ensure their health and viability before selling to customers, who may find establishing a garden with transplanted plugs to be easier than starting from seed.
plunge dip
A deep trough or basin designed to immerse and bathe livestock in a liquid pesticide formulation or other treatment. Cattle, sheep, goats, pigs, or horses are prodded to walk through a narrow channel containing the liquid, briefly submerging most or all of their bodies, which makes it possible to treat large herds of animals quickly and efficiently. See also drenching.

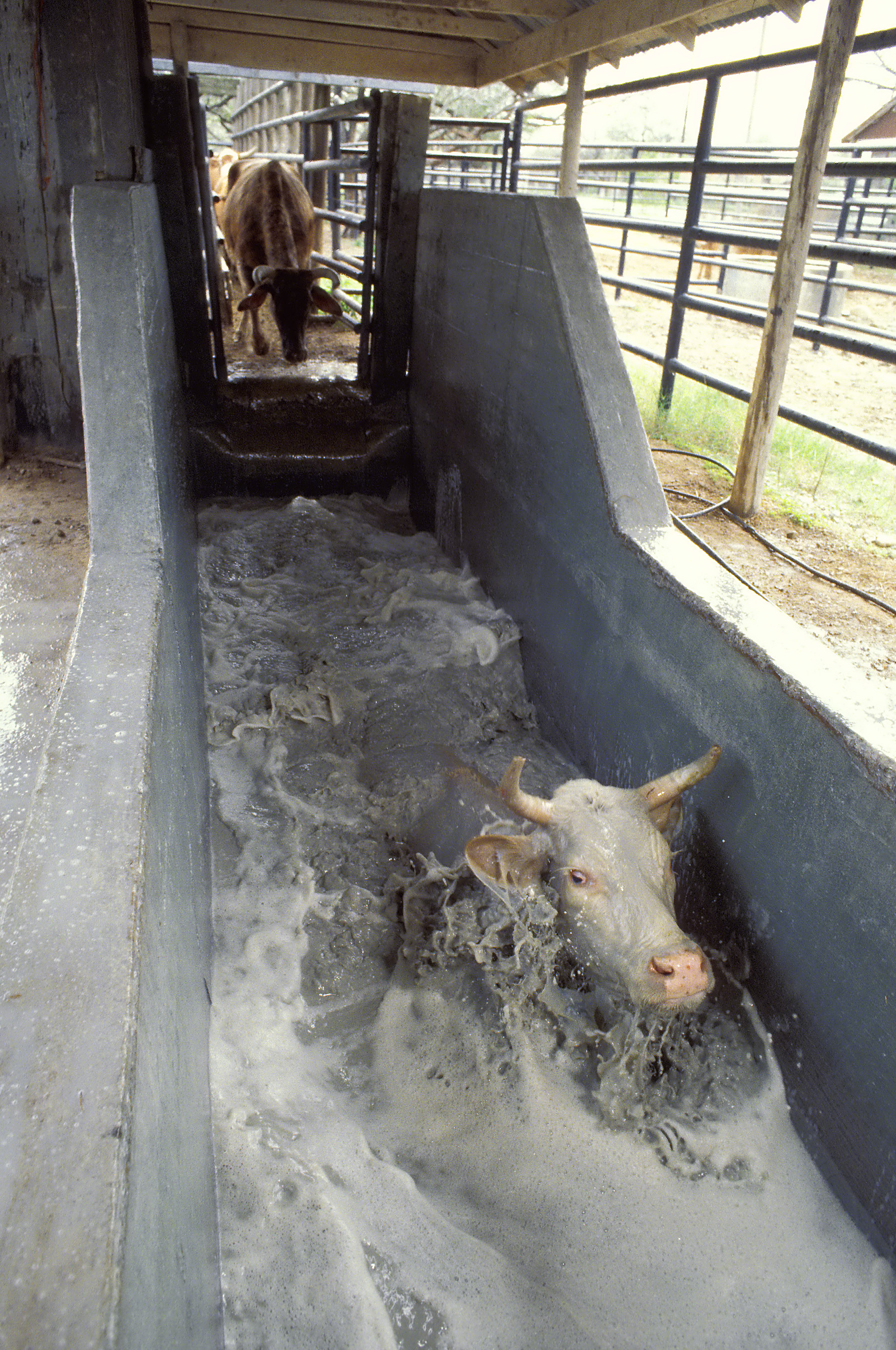
Cattle being treated for ticks in a plunge dip

poddy

A calf that has been orphaned by the loss of its mother. See also dogie.
pollarding
polled
Born without horns, used when describing livestock of a species that is normally horned, e.g. in cattle, goats, and sheep. The term may refer to animals that have been selectively bred to be naturally hornless or, in the broadest sense, to otherwise horned animals that have had their horn buds removed after birth by disbudding.
pollen drift
Unintentional cross-pollination of wild plants by crop plants or vice versa, or between distinct crop varieties or cultivars, through natural mechanisms of pollen dispersal (e.g. wind or insects).
polyculture
The practice of growing or raising more than one species, variety, or breed at the same time and place, often in imitation of the biodiversity of natural ecosystems. Contrast monoculture.
polytunnel

A type of greenhouse in the form of a typically semi-circular, elongated tunnel made from a steel frame covered with transparent polyethylene; temperature, humidity, and air circulation can be adjusted by the opening and closing of doors or vents. Polytunnels are used in similar ways to glass greenhouses and row covers, e.g. for season extension or as nurseries. Though primarily designed to provide temperature increases ranging from 5 to 35 °C (9 to 63 °F) above the outdoor air temperature, they can also protect plants (and animals) against extreme weather and the drying effect of wind.

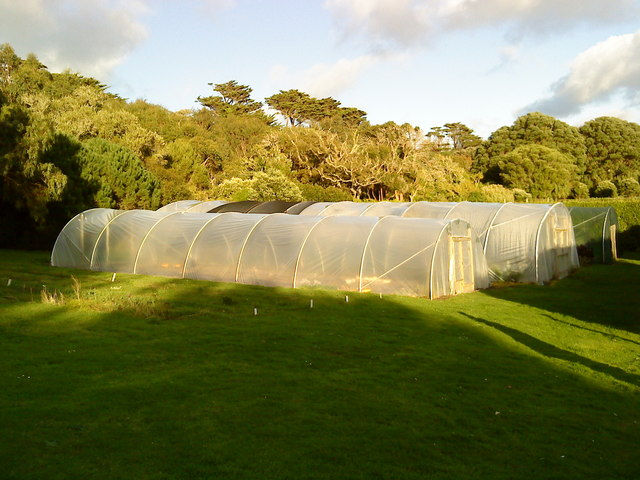
Polytunnels on a farm in England

pomology

The study of fruit and its cultivation.
ponding
The formation of small ponds or pools of water in agricultural fields due to surface runoff from oversaturated or poorly draining soils, or from heavy precipitation or irrigation.
pork
The meat of hogs or pigs.
porker
A pig specifically raised for fresh pork, as opposed to bacon or other processed meats.
postemergent
Occurring after the stage in a plant's life when the first leaves emerge from beneath the soil. The term is used in particular to describe a class of herbicides intended to be applied to weeds which are already leafy or established. Post-emergent herbicides such as glyphosate typically work by killing the cells of mature leaves, thereby inhibiting photosynthesis and causing the whole plant to die; they are generally ineffective on very young plants and seeds. Contrast pre-emergent.
postharvest
1. The stage of commercial crop production immediately following harvesting, which may include any of various processing and handling activities necessary for the harvested crop to become marketable, such as cleaning, drying, cooling, sorting, and packing. Postharvest treatment largely determines a crop's final quality and how and whether it can be sold.
2. Any activities that occur after agricultural products leave or are sold from the farm or ranch where they were produced.
postharvest losses
potash
Any mined or manufactured salts of potassium in water-soluble form, primarily potassium chloride (KCl), potassium sulfate (K2SO4), potassium nitrate (KNO3), and potassium carbonate (K2CO3). These salts are used worldwide as potassium fertilizers for crop plants.
poult
A young turkey, especially one too young for its sex to be determined.
poultry
Any domesticated birds cultivated by humans for their meat, eggs, or feathers, most commonly various species of fowl, especially chickens, turkeys, ducks, geese, and pigeons.
poundage quota
A quantitative limit on the amount of an agricultural commodity (e.g. tobacco or peanuts) that can be produced and/or marketed under the provisions of a governmental price support program.
power take-off (PTO)
A device, commonly found on tractors but also sometimes on farm trucks or other vehicles, that transmits electrical and/or mechanical energy from a power source (e.g. a running engine) to an attached implement or a separate machine which is either pulled behind on a trailer or mounted on the vehicle itself. Modern tractors almost always have a power take-off, which can be connected to a wide variety of equipment to supply power for virtually any automatable agricultural task, e.g. mowing, ploughing, tilling, compacting, distributing agrochemicals, harvesting, etc.
precision agriculture (PA)

A large-scale agricultural management strategy based on observing, measuring, and responding to inter- and intra-field variability in crops and crop yields with the goal of optimizing returns on inputs while preserving resources. Precision agriculture relies on advanced technologies such as GPS, remote sensing, satellite imagery, multispectral imagery, and agricultural drones to collect data on numerous agricultural variables and to generate datasets and maps of spatial variability which can then be used by variable-rate (and often fully automated) applications to optimally distribute resources.
precision seeding
A method of seeding that involves placing seed with attention to precise spacing and depth, either by hand or mechanically, as opposed to broadcast seeding. Precision seeding usually requires less seed and avoids overcrowding and the need for thinning, but is best suited for plants with very high germination rates in order to make full use of the seeded area.
precleaning
Removing unwanted foreign material such as weeds, seeds, dirt, stems, and cobs from harvested grain before it is dried.
preemergent
Occurring before germination, or before the stage in a plant's life when the first leaves emerge from beneath the soil. The term is used in particular to describe a class of herbicides intended to be applied to weeds before their leaves have become established. Pre-emergent herbicides such as paraquat work by inhibiting one or more enzymes that are active in cell division only in new seedlings; they do not inhibit germination from seed itself, nor are they effective on established, mature plants. Contrast post-emergent.
preharvest
prices paid index
An economic index used to monitor and indicate changes in the prices paid by farmers for goods and services used in crop and livestock production as well as those needed for farm family living. In addition to the prices of common farm inputs such as fertilizer, the index also includes interest on debt, taxes payable on farm real estate, and wage rates paid to hired labor. It is used to calculate the price of many fees and fines required by agricultural law, e.g. fees for grazing livestock on federal land.
prices received index
An economic index used to monitor and indicate changes in the prices received by farmers for their products at the point of first sale, usually the farm itself or a local market. Together with the prices paid index, it is used to calculate the parity ratio.
prilled
Pelletized and sold in the form of small, round, solid globules, as is common with many fertilizers, compound animal feeds, and other agrichemicals.
primary tillage
Any general-purpose tillage that is relatively deep and thorough and which leaves the soil surface with a rough, unfinished texture, such as ploughing, as opposed to subsequent, shallower, and more selective secondary tillage. Primary tillage is usually performed immediately after the last harvest, with the objectives of loosening, softening, and aerating the soil to a particular depth, incorporating crop residues and/or fertilizers, and killing weeds.
priming
1. The process of moistening seeds in order to initiate germination prior to sowing in soil or other substrate.
2. The process of removing ripened leaves from tobacco plants by hand.
prizing
The process of packing harvested tobacco leaves into hogsheads.
prod
See goad.
produce
A generalized term used to refer to a variety of farm-produced food crops, usually including fruits and vegetables and sometimes also grains and other products, especially implying that such foods are fresh and generally in the same state as when and where they were harvested.
profit crop
See cash crop.
program crop
A crop for which deficiency payments are paid by a government agency to participating producers, e.g. wheat, corn, barley, grain sorghum, oats, upland cotton, and rice. Contrast non-program crop.
protein crop
Any crop plant whose harvested products naturally contain high concentrations of proteins or amino acids and are therefore important as staple foods or in helping to meet the nutritional requirements of humans or domestic animals. Many oilseeds and grains are considered protein crops.
provender
See fodder.
pruning
The selective removal of certain unwanted plant parts or tissues, such as branches, buds, or roots, from crops or landscape plants during cultivation for any of a variety of reasons, including controlling or redirecting growth, improving or sustaining the plant's health or appearance, reducing risk from falling branches, preparing juvenile plants for transplanting, and increasing the yield or quality of harvestable flowers and fruits. See also topping, pollarding, and coppicing.
pseudocereal

Any domesticated non-grass species that is not a true cereal but is nonetheless cultivated and harvested in much the same way as a cereal, with its "grain" or seed being milled into flour and otherwise used in the same manner as cereal grain. Common examples include amaranth, quinoa, buckwheat, and chia. Compared with true cereals, pseudocereals are similarly rich in many different nutrients but do not contain gluten, making them popular substitutes in gluten-free foods.
puddling
The practice of tilling rice paddies while flooded, traditionally accomplished by dragging a weighted harrow through the submerged soil of the paddy field but also with mechanized implements.
pullet
An immature female chicken.
pulpwood
Any wood used in the manufacture of paper, fiberboard, or other pulp-based products.
pure live seed
The proportion of a collection of plant seeds that is varietally pure (i.e. belonging to one particular species or cultivar) and that germinates successfully, typically expressed as a percentage. It is calculated by multiplying the percentage of pure seed in a test sample by the percentage of germinated seed in the sample and dividing by 100.
push–pull technology
An agricultural pest control strategy that utilizes the intercropping of repellent "push" plants and attractive "pull" plants to divert pests, typically insects, away from vulnerable cash crops. For example, noxious plants (e.g. catnip and Desmodium) may be planted between rows of a valuable cereal crop to repel or "push" certain herbivorous insects away from the cereal, while a more preferable trap crop (e.g. some Brachiaria grasses) is simultaneously planted around the perimeter of the field to attract or "pull" in the insects and keep them there.

== Q ==
quern-stone

A traditional stone tool for manually grinding various materials, especially for milling grain into flour, consisting of a pair of smooth, heavy stones which are rubbed against each other with the grain in between them. A lower stone, called a saddle quern, is usually stationary, while another stone, called a muller, rubber, or handstone, is placed on top of the lower stone and moved by hand in a back-and-forth or rotary motion; often the upper stone has a central hole through which the unground grain is poured and a handle to help rotate it.

== R ==
rafter
To plough a field with furrows so that the earth removed from each furrow is turned over onto the adjacent unplowed ground.
rainfed field
An unirrigated field depending solely on natural precipitation for its water supply, generally surrounded by levees to prevent surface runoff.
raised-bed gardening
A type of horticulture in which the soil surface is raised above the surrounding ground level and usually enclosed in some way within a structure known as a raised bed. These elevated seedbeds allow gardeners to separate their gardens from the surrounding environment and therefore easily maintain the properties of the soil by optimizing density, nutrient levels, and water infiltration and drainage, and adding a barrier to the movement of pests and pathogens from adjacent natural soils. They may also be desirable because they do not require digging into the ground, which may be difficult or impractical in some places.
ram
An adult male sheep of breeding age.
ramification
The natural division of the stems, shoots, or limbs of a plant into successively smaller versions of the same structures as they grow and develop; e.g. the trunks of trees diverge into branches which themselves diverge into smaller branches and so on. Horticulturists artificially stimulate ramification through repeated pruning, coppicing, or pollarding, which in many species, particularly trees and shrubs, induces the divergence of new branches from existing branches. This technique can increase the yield of orchards by inducing the formation of numerous fruit-bearing branches in fruit trees.
ranch
A tract of land dedicated to ranching, i.e. the raising of grazing livestock such as cattle and sheep. The term is used primarily in North America, where it usually implies a very large, open area of privately owned or leased grassland (i.e. pastureland), though similar livestock operations exist worldwide on all types of land. See also station.
rancher

A person who owns or works on a ranch, or who breeds or raises livestock for sale. The term is used primarily in North America. See also grazier.
ranching
The practice of raising grazing livestock such as cattle, sheep, and horses on an area of land called a ranch.
rangeland

Any grassland, shrubland, woodland, wetland, or desert area that is grazed by domestic livestock or wild animals and is generally not suitable for cultivating crops. Rangelands are less intensively managed than pasturelands in that they are dominated primarily by native vegetation rather than by plants established by humans, and typically are not subjected to agricultural practices such as irrigation and the use of fertilizers.
ratooning
The practice of harvesting a crop plant (particularly a monocot species) by cutting most of the above-ground portion of the plant but leaving the roots and the shoot apices intact so as to allow the plant to recover and produce a fresh crop in a subsequent growing season. This procedure usually can be sustained only for a few seasons, as yield tends to decline with each season. Ratoon crops include sugarcane, pineapples, and bananas.
reaping
recalcitrant seed
Any seed or propagule that cannot survive the effects of drying or freezing (generally, temperatures less than 10 °C (50 °F)) and which therefore cannot be stored for long periods of time because they tend to rapidly lose viability. Recalcitrant seeds do not acquire desiccation tolerance during development and are often shed from their parent plants with a relatively high moisture content, making them especially vulnerable to moisture loss. Contrast orthodox seed.
recropping
A type of crop management in which land is cultivated repeatedly in consecutive growing seasons without a fallow period, or in a rotation strategy that lasts longer than one year.
registered livestock
registered seed
The progeny of foundation seed or other approved seed stocks grown by specialized farming operations or extension agencies, handled so as to maintain very high genetic purity and varietal identity, and usually having undergone strict field inspections to ensure conformity with the standards of a formal seed certification scheme. Registered seed is typically one generation beyond foundation seed and of a quality suitable for the production of certified seed, and thus represents an intermediate multiplication step and an additional form of quality control for certain crops prior to distribution for bulk commercial production. Because the risk of genetic drift increases with each additional generation, many crops bypass the registered seed class entirely and proceed directly to multiplication as certified seed.
relay cropping
A type of succession planting in which a new crop is sown or planted in the same field as an existing crop shortly before harvesting the existing crop and clearing it from the field, which then leaves the land available for the newly planted crop to use. This cycle may be repeated throughout the growing season or even year-round with crops intended for various uses, including cash crops and cover crops, as long as the soil remains fertile.
remainder
See crop residue.
rendering
The processing of animal products into stable, usable materials, especially the conversion of fatty tissue into lard or tallow, but also the repurposing of bones, cartilage, and other offal left behind after slaughtering, or any other material which for aesthetic or sanitary reasons is not suitable as food. Rendering may be done in various ways but generally involves grinding or finely chopping the material, drying it (often by steam-drying), and separating the fat from bone, protein, and fine solids (usually by pressing or centrifugation). Both edible and inedible commodities can be produced in this way. Many slaughterhouses perform their own rendering, while others sell their offal to independent rendering operations.
residue
See crop residue.
residue-to-product ratio
A ratio of the amount of unused crop residue left in a field or polytunnel after harvesting a particular crop to the amount of useful crop products harvested (i.e. the yield), usually expressed in terms of the relative masses of residues and products and particularly useful as a metric for the efficiency of bioenergy operations which convert the residues to biochar.
rhizosphere
See root zone.
ribbon farm

A long, narrow, rectangular strip of land that is farmed, usually neighboring other such farms in a series of land divisions lining a common waterway or road, where each division has a short segment of access.
riddle
To grade and sort produce (e.g. potatoes) according to size, using a sieve.
ridge-till
ridging
See hilling.
right-to-farm law
A state law or local ordinance intended to protect agricultural operations from public and private nuisance lawsuits, so long as the operations are in compliance with accepted standards. Such laws typically make it difficult for neighboring property owners or the general public to initiate legal complaints against farmers regarding noise, odor, visual clutter, or dangerous structures associated with their farms.
ripper
See subsoiler.
ripping
A range improvement practice involving the mechanical penetration and shearing of range soils to depths between 8 and 18 inches (20 and 46 cm) for the purpose of breaking hardpan and aiding the infiltration of plant roots, water, nutrients, and organic matter, which can facilitate recovery of grazed vegetation.
roaching
See hogging.
roaster
A large chicken raised for its meat and suitable for roasting, generally at least 12 weeks old and weighing at least 4 pounds (1.8 kilograms). Compare broiler.
roguing
The practice of identifying and removing plants with undesirable characteristics (e.g. plants that are diseased or of an unwanted shape, color, or variety) from agricultural fields, often by hand. The plants, known as rogues, are removed to preserve the quality of the desirable crop plants, often by way of preventing undesirable characteristics from propagating into subsequent generations.
roller
An agricultural implement, typically tractor-drawn, used for flattening an area of land by breaking up large clumps of soil, pushing stones into the soil, and generally creating a smooth, firm seedbed, especially following ploughing or disc harrowing.
rooster
An adult male chicken.
root crop

Any crop plant whose edible or usable portion is harvested from under the ground. Examples include beets, carrots, onions, potatoes, and turnips. These parts may or may not include the plant's actual roots.
root pruning
The mechanical severing or trimming of plant roots, either intentionally or unintentionally, often by the passage of an agricultural implement through soil. When deliberate, it is often done so as to make a plant easier to transplant or to slow its growth.
root zone

The layers of soil or other substrate penetrated by a plant's roots and from which the roots uptake water and nutrients, i.e. the subterranean space that directly influences and is influenced by root growth and activity, encompassing the entire network of vascular roots, rhizomes, tubers, and all other below-ground plant parts extending vertically and laterally beneath the surface, and by some definitions including aerial roots as well. Providing this space with consistent access to water, oxygen, and mineral nutrients is essential for normal plant growth.
rotation crop
A crop that is rotated with other crops as part of a crop rotation sequence.
rotational grazing
The practice of periodically moving herds of grazing livestock between enclosed sections of pasture known as paddocks, allowing the animals to graze the new paddock while the unoccupied paddocks recover and regrow vegetation, as opposed to allowing continuous grazing of the same land indefinitely or feeding the animals in a feedlot. See also crop rotation.

In rotational grazing, livestock are rotated through a series of fenced-off pastures, each of which is able to meet all of the animals' basic needs (food, water, shade/shelter, etc.)

roughage
Any animal feedstuff with high fiber content, such as hay or straw.
row cover
Any flexible, transparent or semi-transparent material, such as fabric or plastic sheeting, that is used as a protective covering to shield plants from extreme temperatures and wind, as well as from insect damage and large herbivores. Row cover can also provide a limited amount of warming in the same way as greenhouses.
row crop
Any crop that can be planted in rows wide enough to allow it to be tilled or otherwise cultivated by agricultural machinery specifically designed for that purpose. Such crops are generally sown by drilling rather than by broadcast seeding.
runholder
See grazier.
ruralism
The advocacy of rural lifestyles, including care of forests and nature. See also agrarianism.

== S ==
scalping
A method of wildland range renovation in which existing vegetation is turned over in a series of long strips, effectively clearing the land in order to improve water infiltration, hasten the decay of organic matter, and reduce competition for nutrients in the soil, which can help plant species usable by grazing animals to colonize and spread across the range.
scarify
1. To stir a soil surface with an implement possessing tines, e.g. a wire rake, but without turning the soil over completely, often to remove shallow-rooted weeds.
2. To use a sharp tool to create a nick or slit in the hard outer coat of a seed in order to aid the penetration of moisture to the endosperm and thereby speed up germination.
scion
An aerial or above-ground plant structure, e.g. a stem or branchlet, that is grafted onto the rootstock of another plant.
scouring
1. Another name for scours.
2. In farming, the separation of soil from the metal surface of a plough blade or tillage implement as it moves through a field, sliding off cleanly rather than sticking to it.
3. In the wool industry, the commercial process of washing raw grease wool in a lukewarm, mildly alkaline water bath to separate dirt, grease, and foreign matter from the fibers.
scours

A severe, often fatal form of diarrhea that can occur in young livestock, most commonly calves, lambs, and piglets. It can be caused by infectious bacteria, viruses, or other parasites, or by sudden changes in diet.
scythe
A handheld agricultural tool designed with one or more curved blades, sharp on the inside edge, used for mowing grass or harvesting crops, especially reaping grain crops prior to threshing. The action of the scythe has largely been automated in modern agricultural machinery such as reapers and combine harvesters. The scythe is similar to a sickle, but has a longer handle intended to be used with two hands instead of one.
season extension
Any method that allows a crop to be grown and/or harvested beyond its natural outdoor growing season or harvest season. Season extension practices most commonly aim to overcome low temperatures or inadequate sunlight in climates where cold weather and shorter days limit the growing season in the spring and fall, but can also include techniques designed to address other seasonally varying conditions such as precipitation and consumer demand, or simply to keep mature crops alive until immediately before the harvest (as opposed to applying postharvest food preservation technologies to prevent spoilage during storage).
second
To hoe between rows of rootcrops that have previously been thinned out.
secondary tillage
seed cotton
Raw cotton which has been harvested but not yet ginned or processed in any other way, containing seeds, lint, and possibly foreign matter.
seed crop
A crop grown specifically so that seeds can be harvested from the mature plants, as opposed to crops grown for their edible or usable non-seed parts without regard for the quality or quantity of any seeds they may produce. A secondary seed crop may be maintained alongside a primary cash crop in order to ensure an adequate supply of seeds for future plantings and/or to manage crop phenotypes by the artificial selection of seeds from parents with desirable characteristics.
seed dressing
The process of coating plant seeds with clay, biofertilizers, pesticides, or inert materials to give them a uniform shape and to increase their size and weight in order to improve visibility, ease of planting, germination rates, or resistance to disease.
seed drill
A mounted or tractor-drawn machine that automates the action of sowing crop seeds, usually by permitting a specified quantity of seed to pass through a hopper with each rotation of a drive wheel and then through tubes that extend to the soil surface, where the seeds are deposited and covered with soil to a precise depth. The result is a series of evenly spaced rows with seeds distributed uniformly between them.

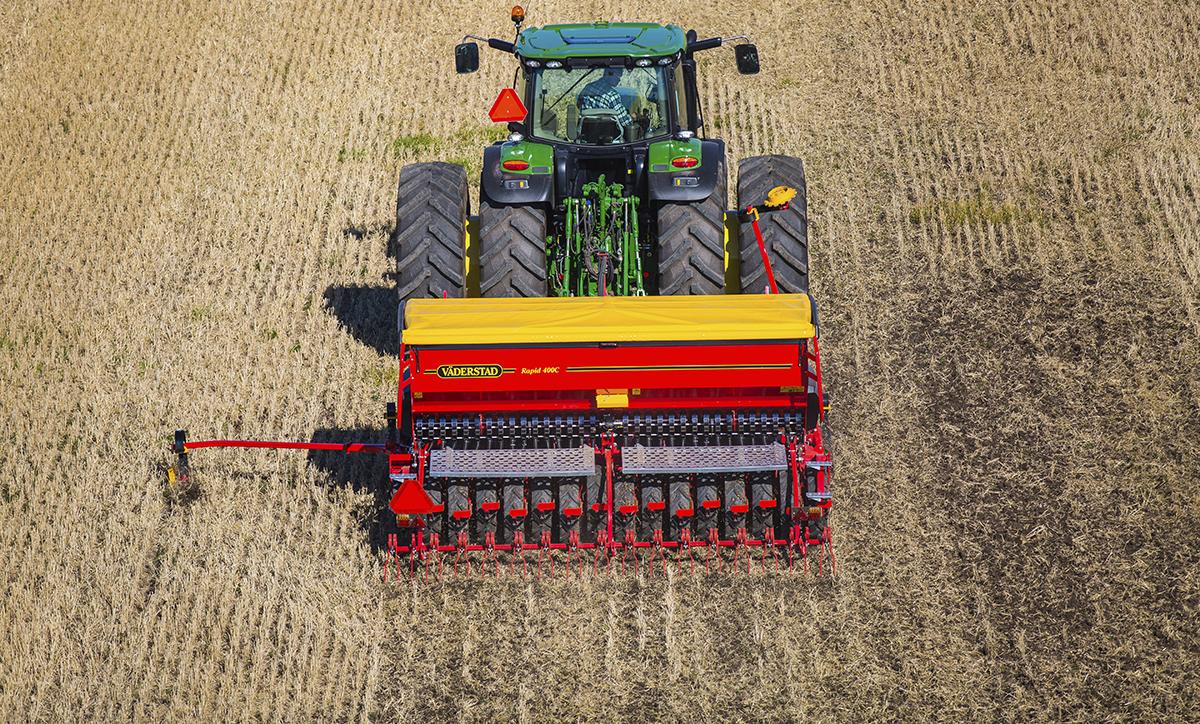
A modern seed drill towed behind a tractor

seed enhancement
Any treatment applied to seeds in order to improve their viability in storage or their likelihood of germination upon being sown. A huge variety of physical, chemical, and biological methods have been developed for different plant species, generally to protect the seed from extreme temperatures or pathogens and to aid the establishment of young seedlings into mature plants, including priming, steeping, hardening, pelleting, coating, stratification, and pregermination, among others.
seedbed

The local soil environment in which seeds are sown, often including not only the soil but also a specially built cold frame, hotbed, or raised bed used to germinate the seeds in a controlled environment before transplanting the resulting seedlings into more natural soils in a garden or field. The use of seedbeds can substantially increase germination rates.
seeding
See sowing.
seedling
The young plant that germinates from a plant embryo contained within a seed.
seedlot
A quantity of seeds, cones, or any other plant propagule of the same species, source, or quality, especially a quantity representing a single collection collected on the same date and at the same location, or even from the same individual plant.
sericulture
The cultivation of silkworms with the goal of producing silk.
set
In orchardry, the total amount of blossoms or fruits growing on one or more cultivated trees at a particular time, or the total amount produced by or harvested from one or more trees during a growing season or production cycle; an approximate quantification of a tree or orchard's total productivity.
setting
(of a brooding hen) In the process of incubating eggs.
shade house
Any structure with a roof or covering that partially obstructs light from reaching the space beneath it (e.g. a mesh fabric or wood slats), providing partial shade to plants or animals living inside. Shade houses are commonly used in horticulture to provide optimal conditions for the growth of shade-loving plants, attenuating direct sunlight and keeping temperatures cool while still permitting air circulation and enough light for photosynthesis to occur.
share
See ploughshare.
sharecropping
A type of agriculture in which a landowner allows a tenant to cultivate a portion of his or her land in return for a share of the crops produced on that land.
sharefarming
shattering
The natural detachment and dispersal of a plant's fruit or seeds upon reaching maturity, i.e. when the fruit is ripe. For agricultural crops where the harvested seed is valuable, such as cereal grains, shattering is usually undesirable because natural dispersal mechanisms often scatter the small seeds haphazardly over the ground, making it difficult or impossible to collect them, while seeds that remain attached to the plant are much easier to harvest. Hence farmers try to time the harvest to occur immediately before their crops begin to shatter. Heavy rain and strong winds may cause premature shattering, which can result in significant yield losses.
sheaf
A bundle of cut stems from a cereal crop (especially wheat) which have been bound together after reaping, traditionally by sickle or scythe but on some modern farms by machines such as a reaper-binder. Multiple sheaves are then "shocked" or arranged into conical stooks to allow the grain to dry before threshing.
shearing
The process by which the woollen fleece of a sheep or other wool-bearing mammal is cut or shaved from its body. Adult sheep are typically shorn once each year.
shearing shed

A building or facility which accommodates large-scale shearing of wool-bearing animals such as sheep, and sometimes also related activities such as classing, pressing, and storing the wool.
shearling
1. A yearling or one-year-old sheep.
2. The skin from a recently shorn sheep or lamb that has been tanned or dressed with the wool left on, having a suede surface on one side and clipped fur on the other.
sheep dip
A plunge dip designed specifically for sheep, containing a liquid pesticide formulation in which the sheep are briefly bathed or immersed in order to kill or remove ectoparasites living on their skin or in their wool.
sheep station
See station.
sheet mulching
shelterbelt
See windbreak.
shifting cultivation
A type of agriculture in which specific plots of land are cleared and cultivated temporarily, often by slash-and-burn methods and for just a few growing seasons, then abandoned and allowed to lie fallow, reverting to their natural vegetation over many more seasons, while the cultivator migrates to a new plot.
shoat
A young domestic pig of either sex, usually from the age of weaning up to five months old and weighing 50 to 160 pounds (23 to 73 kg).
shock
See stook.
shrinkage
sickle
A handheld agricultural tool designed with one or more curved blades, sharp on the inside edge, and typically used for reaping grain crops or cutting succulent forage for feeding livestock. The sickle is similar to a scythe, but used with one hand instead of two.
sickle feather
Either of a pair of long, curved feathers in the tail feathers of a rooster.
side dressing
The practice of applying fertilizers, manure, pesticides, or other soil amendments to the edge or side of a row of crops rather than from directly above, typically by using a cultivator fitted with a side-distributing attachment or another implement specially designed for this purpose. This method is usually slower but allows more precise and more cost-effective distribution than overhead application.
silage
A type of animal fodder made from the green foliage of crop plants preserved by a process of fermentation and storage called ensilage, ensiling, or silaging, which typically involves piling and compressing large amounts of cut green vegetation in an oxygen-poor environment, such as a pit or silo or a bale wrapped tightly with plastic film. Silage is usually made from maize, sorghum, or other cereals, using the entire green plant (not just the grain).

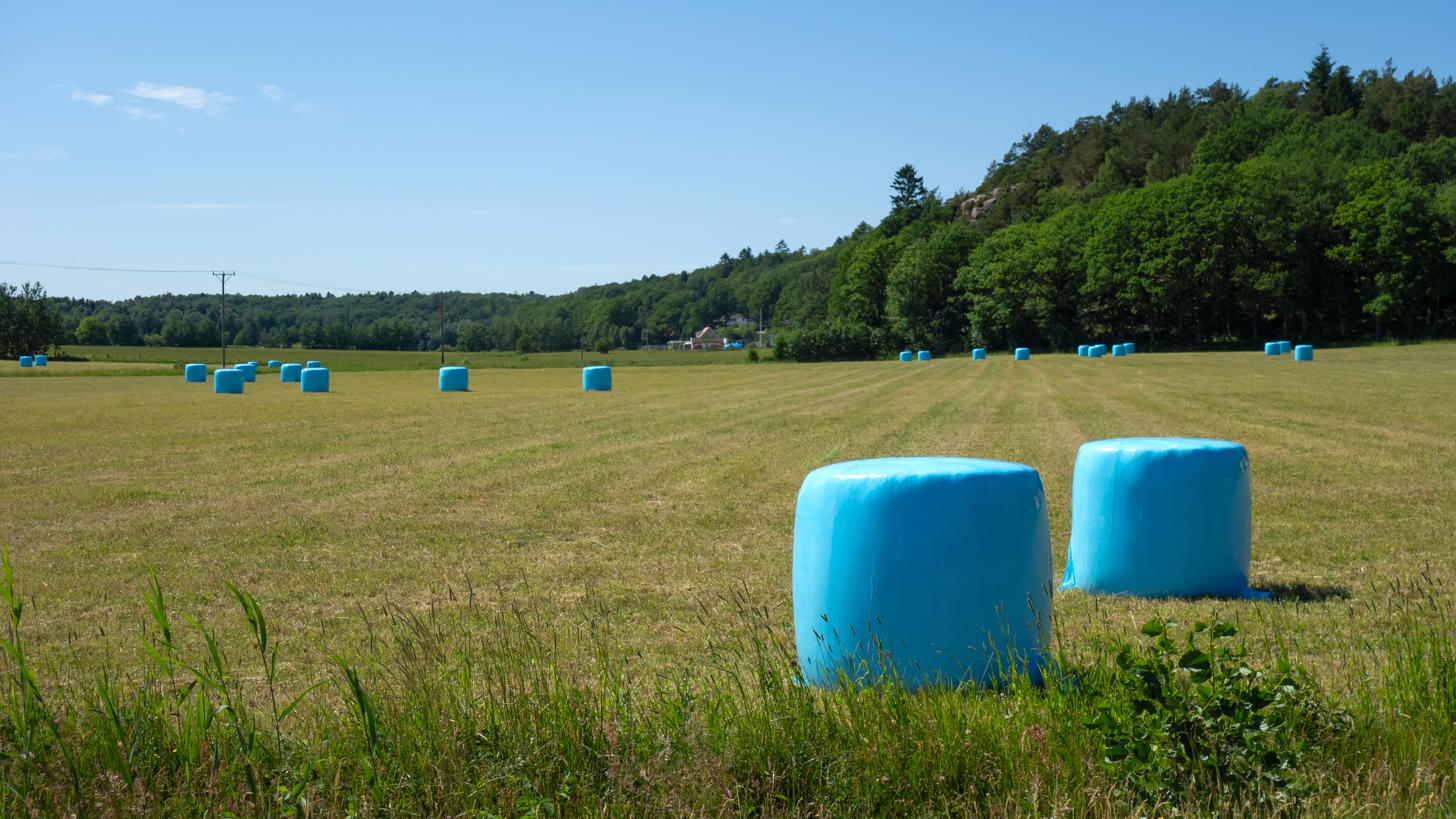
Plastic-wrapped silage bales in a field

silo
Any structure designed for storing bulk materials. In agriculture, tower silos are commonly used to store fermented grain known as silage.
silviculture
The practice of managing or directly controlling the establishment, growth, composition, and quality of natural or deliberately planted forests for any of a number of reasons, especially timber production but also for the cultivation of other forest crops.
sire
The male parent of an animal. The term is used alongside dam, especially for domestic mammals such as cattle and horses.
site-specific crop management (SSCM)
See precision agriculture.
skip row
A row in a crop field that is intentionally left unplanted for any of a variety of reasons, especially so that it can be used as a road or footpath to allow tractors or farmers to access plants in the field's interior, or to improve water-use efficiency by keeping water-intensive field crops such as maize from depleting all available soil water too early in the growing season (because water in the soil between widely spaced rows cannot be reached by plant roots from adjacent rows until later in the season, when the plants have grown to sufficient size, making continuous irrigation unnecessary).
skylark plot
A small area of land in a winter cereal field that is intentionally not drilled with seed so as to leave a patch of shorter vegetation that enables easier foraging for ground-nesting birds such as the skylark.
slash-and-burn
slash-and-char
slaughter
The killing, dressing, and butchering of domestic livestock, usually for food but also for other reasons, including harvesting pelts or culling animals that are diseased or otherwise unsuitable for consumption.
slaughter weight
The total weight of a livestock animal immediately before it is slaughtered.
slaughterhouse

A building or facility where livestock are slaughtered for food. Slaughterhouses produce raw meat, which is then usually processed and preserved in some way before being packaged, distributed, and sold to consumers.
sled row

An unplanted skip row left between planted rows in a tobacco field to allow people and machinery to access the plants in the middle of the field. Usually, two sled rows are left for every four rows of tobacco plants.
slip
A cutting, shoot, or leaf capable of vegetative propagation when rooted.
slurry
Liquid waste from animals that is stored in tanks or open-air lagoons, treated, and then distributed as a fertilizer, often by a tractor-hauled machine such as a slurry spreader.
slurry pit

A hole, tank, reservoir, or other holding area, often lined with concrete but open to the air, into which liquid animal waste and other unusable organic byproducts of agricultural operations, known as slurry, is dumped and then allowed to decompose naturally over a long period of time into a nutrient-rich solution that can with further treatment be reused as a fertilizer. The decomposition process often releases toxic gases, necessitating the use of personal protective equipment when working near slurry pits.
smallholding
smother crop
A dense, fast-growing plant species capable and often cultivated specifically for the purpose of suppressing the growth of weeds by competing strongly for access to light, water, and nutrients. An ideal smother crop competes with the weeds but not with other crops. Once it has served its purpose, it may be ploughed into the soil as green manure along with any weeds that may have survived. Smother crops are an example of biological pest control.
smudge pot
Any heat-producing device placed between the trees of an orchard to keep the trees warm and prevent the accumulation of frost on fruits and flowers, which are often highly vulnerable to damage from cold temperatures. Historically, smudge pots burned petroleum to produce an open flame at the top of a long chimney, though colloquially the term now encompasses modern frost control methods, which usually rely on propane or electric space heaters instead.

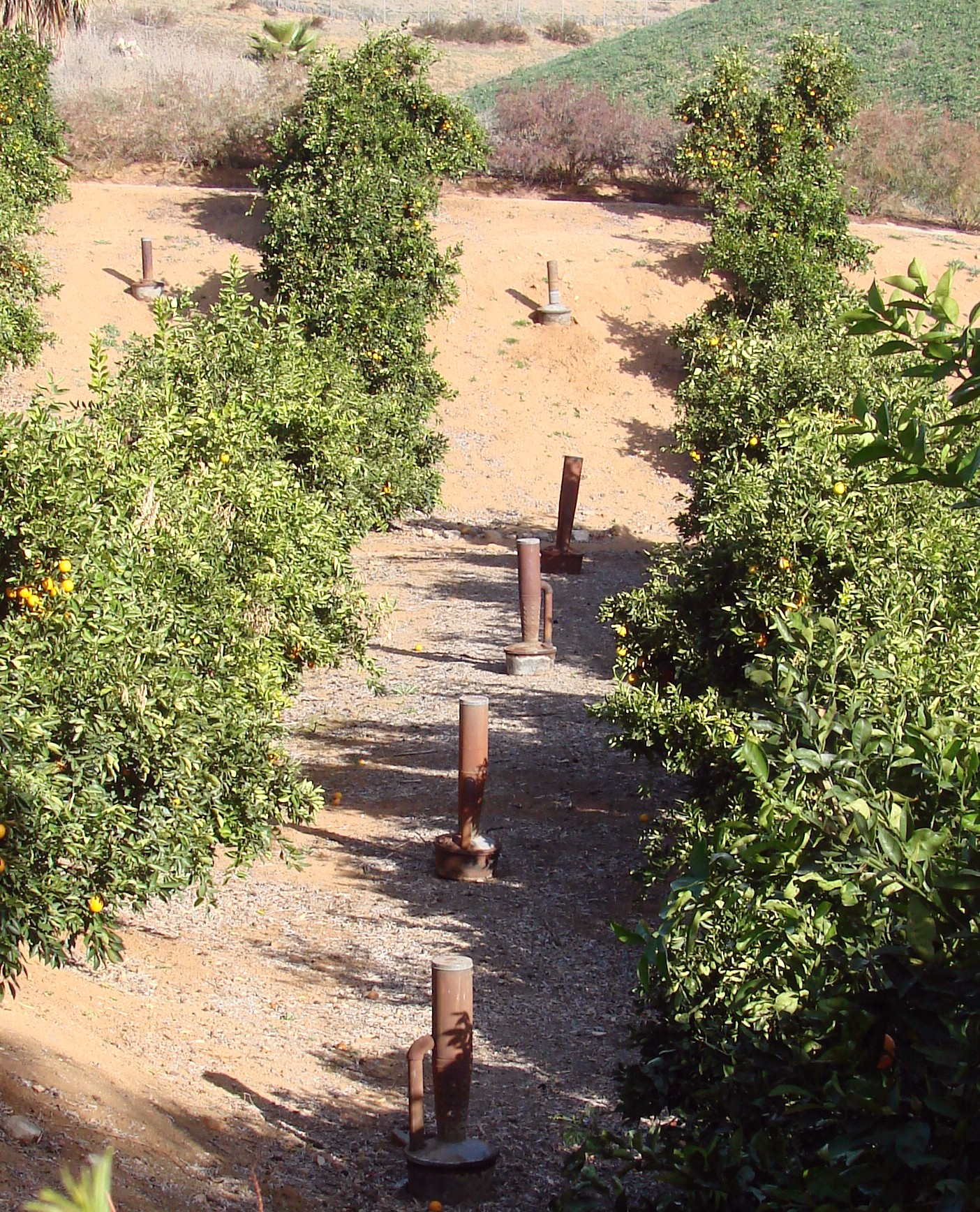
Old-fashioned smudge pots in an orange grove in California

sod

The grass- and forb-covered surface of the ground; the uppermost layer of soil beneath such a surface, containing and held together by a dense mat of grass roots, or a section of this layer that is cut and extracted from the ground in order to be transplanted.
soil amendment

Any substance which is added to soil to improve the soil's quality, especially its fertility and mechanics, either to make poor soils more usable or to maintain soils that are already in good condition. In the broadest sense, the term includes all organic and synthetic soil-borne fertilizers, pesticides, and other agrichemicals, as well as other soil additives such as perlite and vermiculite.
soil compaction
The degradation of soil structure, generally by an increase in bulk density and/or decrease in porosity, due to externally or internally applied loads. Conventional agricultural methods, especially the repeated use of heavy machinery, often lead to compaction of the subsoil, creating impermeable underground layers such as hardpan which severely restrict water and nutrient cycles and thereby adversely affect crop growth, yield, and quality, not to mention numerous off-site ecological processes.
soil inoculant

A soil amendment containing living microorganisms such as bacteria or fungi which form symbiotic, mutualistic relationships with plants growing in the soil, benefiting the growth and health of plants in any of a variety of ways, typically by improving plant nutrition (as with biofertilizers), stimulating plant hormone production, or inducing systemic acquired resistance to plant diseases.
soil science
The scientific study of soil as a natural resource, including its formation, classification, and mapping; the physical, chemical, and biological properties of soils; and how these properties relate to the use and management of soils for agricultural purposes.
soil shredder
A machine that crushes or pulverizes large soil aggregates and clods to facilitate uniform soil mixing and topdressing application.
soil solarization
A non-chemical pest control method applied to soils before planting, in which the soil is mulched, covered with a transparent plastic sheet, and then exposed to direct sunlight, creating a greenhouse effect which traps solar energy and increases the soil temperature to levels that kill or weaken soil-borne pathogens, including many bacteria, fungi, nematodes, insects, mites, and weeds, thereby preventing their proliferation when the sheet is removed and the soil is finally cultivated. Solarization is most effective in warm climates, and is usually practiced on a relatively small scale in gardens or on organic farms.
southwest injury
See sunscald.
sow
A mature female hog, especially one that has given birth at least once.
sow stall
See gestation crate.
sowing

The process of distributing the seeds (or any other type of propagule) of crop plants in or upon an area of fertile soil, either by hand or by mechanical methods. Sowing is one of the first steps in any seasonal farming operation.
spaying
The surgical removal of the ovaries (and sometimes also the oviducts and uterus) of a female animal, which permanently prevents reproduction and eliminates the secretion of ovarian hormones. It is commonly performed on livestock as a method of birth control or behavioral modification, or to improve the commercial value of certain products harvested from the mature animal; e.g. heifers are usually spayed at a young age in order to improve the quality of their meat. The male equivalent is called castration.
spoilage
The process by which an agricultural product (typically food) becomes unsuitable for use or ingestion by the consumer. Natural decomposition of agricultural crops by bacteria and fungi is the most common cause of food spoilage. Depending on the type of product, shelf life may be significantly increased with proper packaging and storage and by the application of various food preservation techniques.
sprigging
The planting of small sections of a plant cut from rhizomes or stolons, known as sprigs, including crowns and roots, but without any accompanying soil (i.e. only the bare-root sprig itself is planted). This differs from plugs, which are transplanted from containers along with small amounts of soil, and sod, which consists of sheets of turfgrass and the uppermost layers of the soil substrate. Sprigs may be planted manually or mechanically, and are usually placed at regularly spaced intervals in furrows or holes.
springer
A pregnant cow, especially a heifer, that is due to give birth soon.
sprinkler irrigation
The overhead application of water to a crop by any of a wide range of mechanisms and designs, encompassing both stationary and moving sprinklers, which are often fully or partially automated, e.g. wheel lines and center-pivot systems.
sprout damage
The undesirable germination of wheat kernels that often occurs on wheat crops when wet field conditions persist in the final stage of crop maturation, just prior to and during the harvest. Recently cut wheat that has been left lying in the field prior to threshing is particularly vulnerable; windrowing and drying the cut stalks as quickly as possible is therefore a high priority for wheat farmers. Sprouted kernels contain extremely high concentrations of the enzyme alpha-amylase, which can negatively impact the baking quality of flour made from the wheat; the presence of this enzyme can be determined by the Falling Number test.
stable
A building divided into separate stalls in which domestic livestock, especially horses, are kept, sheltering them from the elements and giving them a private space where they can reside during illness or pregnancy.
stag
A male bovine animal (a bull) that has been castrated relatively late in life, e.g. after reaching maturity, as opposed to the normal practice of castrating males while they are still calves. Compare steer.
staking
The practice of supporting the growth of a plant by placing a stake or artificial support in the ground next to it. It is widely used to cultivate plants with vine-like habits.
stalk rot
A generic term for a variety of plant diseases caused by molds and other fungi which grow in the stems and stalks of plant crops and weaken their structural integrity so greatly that they easily fall over in wind, rain, or snow, potentially killing the crop or making it much more difficult to harvest.
stallion
An adult male horse or donkey that has not been gelded, especially one used for breeding purposes.
staple fiber
Any textile fiber, natural or synthetic, of discrete and consistent length, as opposed to a filament fiber, for which length varies continuously. Staple fibers are defined by a characteristic length, to which either natural fibers consistently grow (e.g. certain cultivars of cotton tend to produce short, medium, long, or extra-long staple lengths), or to which synthetic fibers or blends are consistently cut after manufacture.
staple food

A food that is eaten routinely and in such quantities that it constitutes a dominant portion of the standard diet for a given population or demographic, supplying many or most of the basic nutrients needed for survival or health. Staple foods vary by location and culture but are typically inexpensive or readily available foods that can be stored for long periods of time without spoiling or decaying. Examples include cereals, starchy tubers or root vegetables, meat, fish, eggs, and dairy products.
station

A large landholding dedicated to the raising of grazing livestock, especially cattle or sheep. The term is used primarily in Australia, New Zealand, and other British Commonwealth territories, and has the same meaning as the North American term ranch. An owner or operator of a station is called a grazier, pastoralist, or runholder.
steer
A male bovine animal (a bull) that has been castrated, usually as a young calf so as to yield better-quality meat later in life. Compare stag.
stocker
Any cattle being backgrounded prior to finishing, especially a calf or yearling.
stockgrower
See rancher.
stockyard
A holding area for livestock, especially at a market where they are being sold.
stook

An upright conical or tent-like arrangement of sheaves of the cut stalks of a grain crop, placed so as to keep the grain-heads off the ground prior to collection for threshing. Stooked grains typically include wheat, barley, oats, and maize.

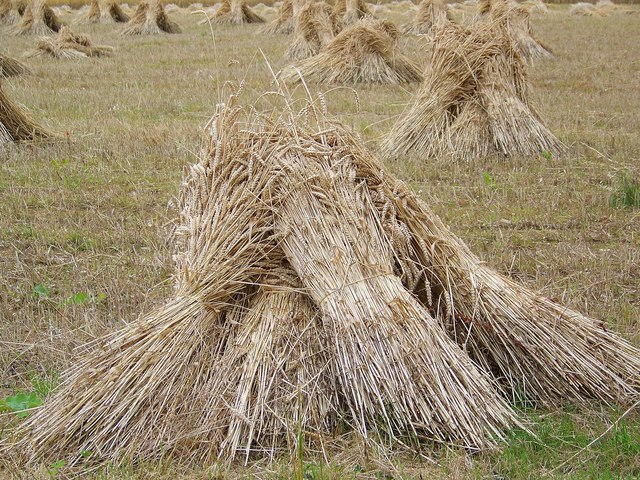
Sheaves of wheat placed upright to dry, a traditional practice known as stooking, shocking, or stacking

stool
The living roots and stumps of felled trees, especially of trees that have been coppiced and from which new growth eventually sprouts.
storage clamp
A compact pile, mound, or heap of materials, especially one used for the temporary storage of root crops such as potatoes, turnips, and rutabagas.
stover
The leaves, stalks, and other field residues of certain crops, especially maize, sorghum, and soybean, that are left in a field after harvesting. It may be used as a mulch or green manure, directly grazed by livestock, or dried and collected as fodder.
stratification
The process of treating the seeds of certain plant crops with any of various treatments intended to simulate the natural conditions that the seeds typically experience prior to germination. The seeds of many plant species naturally undergo a phase of embryonic dormancy which prevents them from sprouting prematurely in environments with suboptimal growing conditions, where the probability of survival is low. In order to break this dormancy, generally these seeds must be exposed to a precise combination of cold temperatures, moisture, and/or some form of physical damage capable of penetrating the hard outer seed coat, often in a specific order and for specific lengths of time. Only after surpassing this developmental barrier are the internal biochemical reactions triggered that allow the seed to begin growing into a new seedling.
straw
An agricultural byproduct consisting of the dry stalks of cereal plants after the grain and chaff have been removed. Straw has numerous different uses, including as mulch, biofuel, bedding and fodder for livestock, and construction material.
strip cropping
stubble
A field residue consisting of the portion of a plant remaining in the ground after harvesting is complete, usually the roots below the surface and an attached portion of the stem or stalk extending upright above the surface.
stubble-mulching
The practice of leaving the stubble or crop residue essentially in place on a plot of harvested cropland as a mulch or surface cover during a fallow period. Stubble-mulching can prevent soil erosion and conserve soil moisture.
stud
stumpage
The price paid by a logging business to a landowner for the right to harvest timber from their land, usually determined by a rate applied to the number of trees or the volume (in cubic metres or board-feet) or mass (in tons) of wood harvested.
sty

A small outdoor enclosure in which domestic swine are raised as livestock, generally little more than a fenced-in area of bare dirt or mud.
subirrigation

The practice of delivering irrigation water through ditches or pipelines directly into porous underground spaces within a crop's rooting depth; more broadly, any method of supplying water to plants from underneath the soil surface, including those grown in pots and containers, as opposed to supplying it at the surface or from above.
subsistence agriculture
Agricultural production that is practiced in order to meet the needs of the farmer or producer, as opposed to that practiced in order to generate profit by selling the agricultural products to consumers. Subsistence agriculture usually refers to farmers growing various food crops strictly for use by themselves and their families, typically on smallholdings, with the output of the farm targeted principally at fulfilling basic survival needs and local requirements, and generally implies small amounts of inputs, use of crude or traditional farming tools, reliance on unskilled labor (often family members), low yields, and little or no surplus. It primarily occurs in the developing world, though most modern subsistence farmers also participate in trade to some degree.
subsoiler

A tractor-mounted farm implement used for tilling soil at depths much below the levels normally worked by mouldboard ploughs, disc harrows, or rototillers. While most such tools break up and turn over surface soil to a depth of 15–20 centimetres (6–8 in), subsoilers can often extend the action to as deep as 75 centimetres (30 in). They typically consist of three or more heavy, curved shanks fitted with replaceable points and sometimes with horizontal wings, which are used to lift and shatter the hardpan that builds up in deeper layers due to soil compaction.
succession planting
suckle
To supply or take milk from the breast or udder of an animal, used especially to describe the nourishment of newborn mammals including swine and cattle.
suckling
An infant or young animal that suckles milk for most or all of its nourishment; one that has not yet been weaned.
sugar bush
A natural or cultivated stand of maple trees used for the production of maple syrup.
summer fallow
The practice of deliberately not producing crops from a particular field or area of cropland (fallowing) during the summer, or during the regular growing season. The term may also refer to the unused land itself. Intensive cultivation depletes soils of moisture and nutrients and disrupts many of the natural ecological processes that would ordinarily restore them, which are typically most active during the summer. Fallowing fields in the summer thus maximizes the opportunity for impoverished soils to recover by allowing these processes to continue instead of interrupting them with another season of cultivation. It is a common technique in dryland farming.
summer range

Land or pasture reserved for grazing during the warmer months (i.e. spring and summer), when wild or cultivated forage is abundant and can satisfy all or nearly all of an animal's feed requirements, such that the need to supply fodder for sustenance is greatly reduced and thus feed costs are cheaper. More generally, the term may describe the areas occupied or frequented during the warm season by open-range livestock or wild animals which exhibit seasonal migration patterns, moving between higher, cooler elevations in the summer and lower, warmer elevations in the winter. Contrast winter range.
sun-cured

(of a food) Having been dried by a process in which the freshly harvested produce (e.g. tomatoes) is exposed to direct sunlight in open air, often for multiple days, causing most of the water of the fresh weight to be lost by evaporation.
sunscald

Permanent damage to the bark covering tree trunks and branches, often in the form of conspicuous cracks and fissures, caused by an abrupt change from relatively high daytime temperatures to freezing conditions at night, usually during the winter in warm temperate or subtropical climates. These conditions may compromise the health of trees growing in orchards, and may damage flowers and fruits as well.
super seeder
support price
A legislated minimum price for a particular commodity, maintained through a variety of mechanisms, such as minimum import prices, nonrecourse loans, and purchase programs.
sustainable agriculture
swampbusting
The drainage of a natural swamp or wetland in order to make the land arable for the cultivation of agricultural crops, or to render it usable for any other purpose.
swathe

A row of cut stalks of hay or straw left on the ground by a mower or mechanical harvester; a windrow.
swather

A machine that cuts hay or small grain crops and forms them into windrows, with the goal of decreasing the time required for drying the crop to a moisture content suitable for harvesting and storage. A sickle bar or mower cuts the stems of the crop, and a reel helps the cut stems fall neatly onto a conveyor, which then deposits them into a windrow with all stems oriented in the same direction. The mown strip left behind is called the swathe.
sweetening
The sowing of additional seed of the same crop into a previously sown field without disrupting the original planting, in order to supplement thinly planted areas which did not or are not expected to germinate at the same density as the rest of the field. Even when the original seed is uniformly sown, it may fail to establish at the expected density due to low viability or adverse weather conditions such as a late frost.
swill
A mixture of water and discarded kitchen refuse that is fed to livestock (especially swine); or any liquid food for animals.
swine

Any member of several species of omnivorous mammals of the family Suidae, having cloven hooves, flat snouts, and thick hides covered with sparse, coarse hair; the term may be applied to such animals both collectively and individually. Adult males are called boars and adult females are called sows. Domestic swine are commonly raised for their meat, known as pork, and wild swine are often hunted.

== T ==
tagging
See crutching.
tailing
See docking.
tailrace
A manmade channel or millrace built to carry water away from a mill, water wheel, turbine, or mining operation. Compare headrace.
tailwater
1. In furrow and border irrigation, water that drains from the lower end of the furrows, having run off instead of penetrating the soil. It is sometimes subsequently usable for the irrigation of lower-lying land.
2. The water immediately downstream of a dam, spillway, bridge, culvert, or any other hydraulic structure, or the water that passes through a tailrace.
tallow
Fat rendered from the tissue of slaughtered cattle, sheep, or other livestock to be used in the manufacture of candles, soap, or any of a variety of other products.
tame hay
Hay cut from domesticated, cultivated crop plants such as clover, timothy, or alfalfa, as opposed to wild hay, which is cut from wild or native grasses.
tankage
A highly nutritive animal feed concentrate made of processed meat byproducts.
tapping
The process by which sap or latex is extracted from the trunks of cultivated trees.
teart
Plants or soils that contain high concentrations of molybdenum; or the poisoning of livestock that graze on vegetation grown in these soils.
tedder

A tractor-drawn machine that uses rapidly moving pitchfork-like tines to aerate or "wuffle" freshly cut hay on the ground in a process known as tedding, typically prior to windrowing. Use of a tedder allows the hay to dry more quickly, which can result in improved aroma and color.
tedding
The spreading of material across an agricultural field, especially manure to serve as a fertilizer, or certain crops (e.g. hay and flax) to help them dry on the ground before collecting them. Traditionally tedding was done manually with tools such as pitchforks, but in modern practice it is often done by a mechanized manure spreader or hay tedder.
tempering

One of several steps in the dry milling and fractionation of certain cereal crops such as wheat and maize, in which moisture is added to the grain in order to aid the removal of bran from the endosperm.
tenant farmer
A person who operates and resides on farmland owned by a landlord. Tenant farming involves a contract between the landowner and the tenant farmer in which the landowner contributes his land and often a measure of operating capital and management in exchange for the tenant farmer's labor. The tenant farmer may also pay rent to the landowner, though the form and measures of payment and the rights the tenant has to the land vary widely with local custom.
tensiometer
An instrument used in irrigation management to measure the amount of moisture in cultivated soil and thereby provide an indicator of how much and how frequently to irrigate.
terrace
A sloped plane such as a hillside that has been landscaped into a series of flat surfaces or platforms resembling steps, i.e. successively receding as one travels uphill, and following the lateral contours of the topography. Graduated terraces are commonly built to create level spaces for agriculture in hilly or mountainous terrain. The shaping of a natural landscape into terraces is known as terracing.

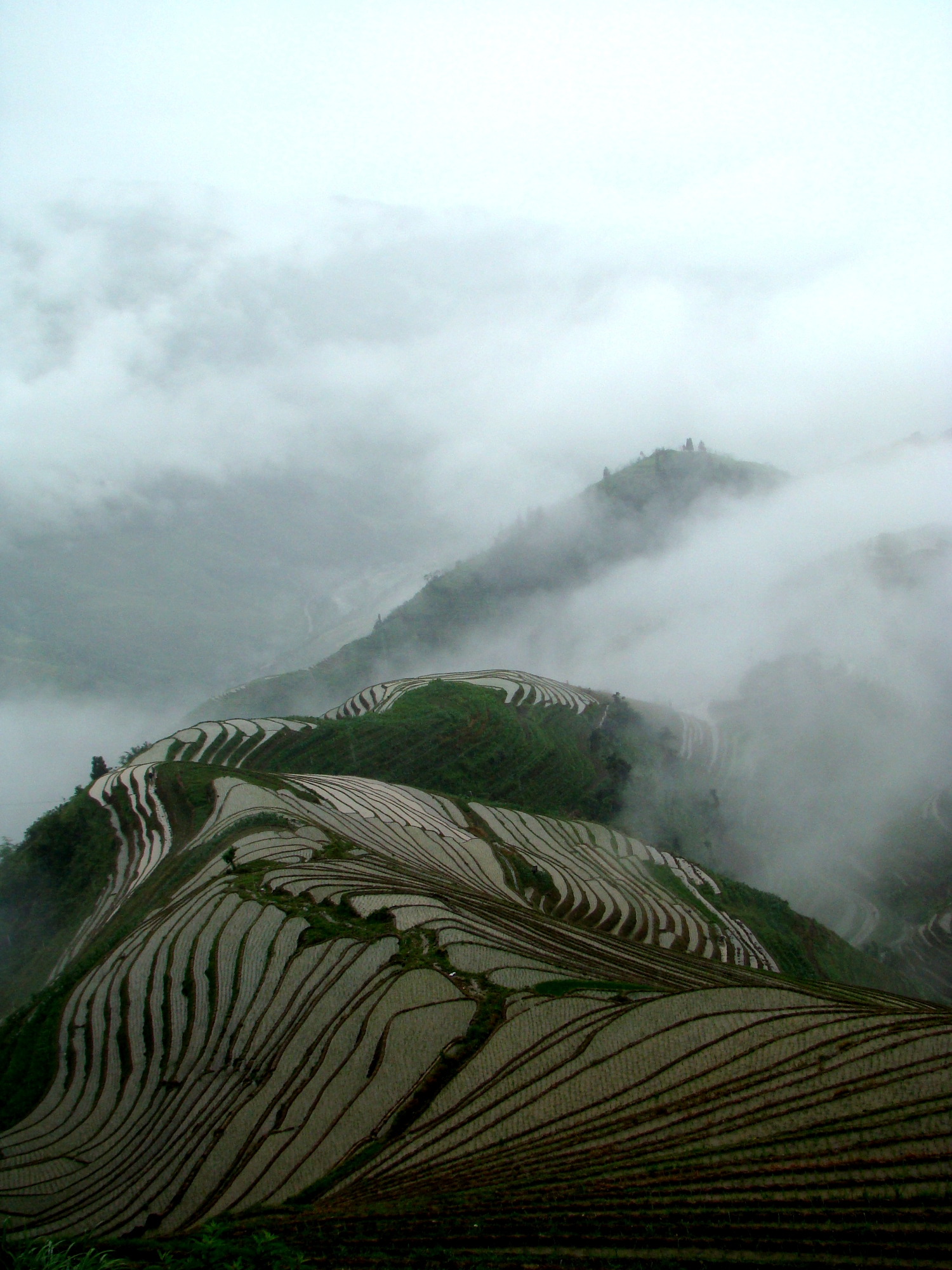
A hillside in China which has been terraced for rice cultivation

threshing
The process of loosening and separating the edible part of a grain or other crop from the chaff to which it is attached, without removing the bran. In grain cultivation, threshing immediately follows reaping and precedes winnowing.
threshing floor
A specially flattened outdoor or indoor surface of earth, stone, or wood, often circular and paved, against which grain was traditionally threshed by trampling or stamping it into the ground with the feet of people or animals, and where it was subsequently winnowed as well. Mechanized threshing machines have since made threshing floors obsolete.
threshing machine

threshing stone
tillage
1. The preparation of agricultural soil by any of various types of mechanical agitation, whether human-powered, animal-powered, or mechanised, such as digging, hoeing, raking, ploughing, and harrowing. In this sense, it is also referred to as tilling.
2. The land that is tilled.
tiller
1. A stem or shoot which arises from the base or crown of a grass plant, especially any shoot that emerges after the initial parent shoot germinates from a seed. Many grass species, including cereals such as barley, produce multiple tillers which grow laterally from the same dense tuft in moist soils, a form of vegetative propagation known as tillering.
2. Colloquially, any farm implement used for tilling soil, e.g. a rotary tiller.
tilth
The physical texture, structure, and general condition of soil with respect to its suitability for planting or growing a crop, as indicated by parameters such as moisture content, aeration, soil aggregate stability, rate of water infiltration, and drainage. Soil with good tilth has large pore spaces allowing air and water movement, yet is also capable of holding water and plant nutrients for substantial periods of time. The primary objective of tillage is to improve tilth by mechanical manipulation of the soil, with the goal of increasing crop yield; fertilization, irrigation, and soil amendments can also positively impact tilth. When applied excessively, however, these practices may have the opposite effect, causing the soil to lose its structure and become compacted.
timber
See lumber.
tobacco barn
A barn specially designed for air-curing tobacco plants.
tom
A young male turkey, usually less than one year old.
top dressing

The practice of applying fertilizers, manure, pesticides, or other soil amendments to the surface of agricultural land (i.e. broadcasting it from above and without subsequently tilling it into the soil), often directly onto a growing crop, and especially implying aerial application from aircraft. This is in contrast to applying amendments on the side or individually to each plant via more precise methods.
topographical tetrazolium test

A test of seed viability in which ungerminated seeds are nicked and then soaked in an aqueous solution containing triphenyl tetrazolium chloride (TTC), a chemical indicator which is reduced by the activity of dehydrogenase enzymes in living tissues, changing their color from white to red, but remains unreacted in metabolically inactive or necrotic tissues. A seed embryo that stains red is assumed to be metabolically active and therefore likely to germinate. The TTC assay is used in agriculture for quick estimations of viability without having to wait for actual germination, which can often take days or weeks, but may also yield misleading or unreliable results in certain plant species.
topping
The removal by mowing or cutting of the aerial parts of a plant, i.e. the uppermost parts of the canopy, including the highest or most distal ends of shoots, stems, stalks, trunks, or branches, for any of a variety of reasons, especially in order to prevent the development of terminal reproductive structures such as flowers and fruits, with the ultimate aim of diverting the plant's resources to the growth of other structures such as roots and leaves, or of preventing unwanted dispersal of seeds. Cover crops are commonly topped to prevent their seeds from contaminating the soil they are covering. Topping is also done for health and aesthetic reasons. See also pruning, coppicing and pollarding.
topsoil
The uppermost layer of soil, nearest the surface, widely variable in depth but typically less dense and more pliable than layers below it, making it easy to till but also more susceptible to erosion. In many places topsoils will form naturally from a mixture of organic and inorganic material over time, but it may also be added to a ground surface or created by ploughing.
towbar
See drawbar.
tractor
A type of heavy engineering vehicle designed specifically to deliver very high tractive effort or torque at slow speeds for the purpose of hauling a trailer or machinery, especially one which provides the power and traction to mechanize agricultural tasks. Modern tractors serve a wide variety of different functions, with many types of agricultural implements able to be towed behind or mounted on them, such as ploughs, harrows, and cultivators; tractors may also provide a source of electrical power if the implement is mechanized.
transhumance
A type of pastoralism involving the seasonal movement of livestock between fixed summer and winter pastures.
transplanter
An agricultural machine designed to automate the process of transplanting small plants or seedlings from starter pots to a field, obviating the time and labor required for manual transplanting.
transplanting

The process of moving a plant from one location to another, i.e. physically removing the whole plant, including its roots, from the substrate of the original location and then replanting it in the substrate of the new location. Seeds and plugs are often initially planted in starter pots in a nursery and then transplanted to outdoor settings only after the young plants have become sufficiently established, as an alternative to simply sowing seeds outdoors from the beginning. Transplanting may also be done for other reasons, e.g. when moving container-grown plants to larger pots as they grow in size. A machine that automates the action of transplanting is known as a transplanter. Many agricultural crops are relatively tolerant of being transplanted and are quick to re-establish themselves in new locations, while other species are susceptible to transplant shock, such that horticulturists must exercise great caution when moving them.
trap crop
Any plant that is cultivated in order to attract the attention of agricultural pests, usually insects, and thereby distract them away from nearby crops. In small farms or gardens, this practice can help save the primary crop from decimation by pests without the use of pesticides.
tree farm
A wild forest that is managed for timber production, or a plantation or nursery where trees are deliberately planted and cultivated for commercial sale, either for timber or as ornamental plants.
tree wrapping
The practice of completely covering the lower trunk of a tree (commonly a sapling) or any other sensitive plant with straw, crêpe paper, burlap, or plastic, generally in order to protect it from cold temperatures, wind, sunscald, or insects.
trellis

A lattice or framework of interwoven or intersecting rods of wood, bamboo, metal, or plastic used to support or display climbing plants, especially trees and shrubs but also garden crops such as tomatoes.
trench silo
A long, deep trench dug in the ground, often in a hillside, and sometimes lined with wooden or concrete retaining walls to be used as an in-ground silo for storing silage. They are common in arid climates where the ground is well-drained.
trickle irrigation
See drip irrigation.
trough
See manger.
truck farm
A farm that grows vegetables or fruits and then ships the harvested produce, often in boxes hauled by trucks, to one or more markets for sale to consumers (as opposed to selling the produce at the farm itself, as with a farm stand).
tup
A mature male sheep (a ram), at least 18 months old and capable of siring offspring.
tupping
Copulation between a ram and a ewe.
turf
See sod.
turning out
The release of livestock from a shelter or enclosure into an open space, usually onto pasture after a period of being housed. For example, cattle that have been kept in buildings during the winter are turned out to grass in the spring.
turnrow
See headland.
twibill
A type of mattock which pairs a vertical axe blade with a horizontal adze blade, combining chopping and levering functions in a single tool.

== U ==
U-fork
See broadfork.
U-Pick
See You-Pick.
udder
The fleshy, bag-like mammary gland found just in front of the hind legs of many female ungulate mammals, including cattle, sheep, goats, and horses. The udder contains nipples or teats that secrete milk, which is used as a food source for nursing young and collected by humans in the process of milking.
undergrazing
The practice of neglecting to allow livestock to graze an area of pasture for an excessively long period of time, such that the vegetation covering it reaches maturity or the end of its life cycle well before animals have the opportunity to graze it and thus is not eaten when it is optimally palatable or nutritious.
urban agriculture
The practice of agriculture in urban environments (as opposed to rural areas, with which agriculture is more commonly associated), especially the cultivation of plants for food production but also inclusive of animal husbandry, aquaponics, beekeeping, or any other type of agriculture which has been adapted to an urban context. Urban areas present unique challenges for agriculture due to space limitations, difficult or inconsistent access to adequate fresh water, fertile soil, and sunlight, and exposure to urban pollutants. Urban agriculture is often practiced in the interest of food security, locavorism, and sustainable urban development, or simply as a hobby or for aesthetic reasons. Examples include community gardens, vertical farming, windowfarming, rooftop gardening, and building-integrated agriculture.

== V ==
vapor drift
The unintentional diffusion of vapors from an area where pesticides are applied (generally by large-scale fumigation methods) to adjacent areas, which can harm non-target crops or animals, as well as humans.
Vavilovian mimicry
A form of mimicry in plants in which a weed or unwanted plant species evolves to share one or more characteristics with a domesticated plant species, often an agricultural crop, through many generations of unintentional selection caused by the practice of removing weeds. The deliberate removal of weeds from crop fields artificially selects against traits that distinguish the weed from the crop plant, because weeds that physically or chemically resemble the crop plant, or otherwise follow the same phenology or growth habit, are more likely to escape notice by the farmer, evade chemical or mechanical removal, and thereby survive to reproduce.
veal
The meat of calves, as opposed to the beef of older cattle.
vealer
A calf, especially of a dairy breed, that is usually raised on milk only and slaughtered at less than four months old and less than 350 pounds (160 kg), to be sold as veal.
veganic farming
See animal-free agriculture.
vermicompost
A type of compost produced as a result of the decomposition processes performed by certain species of earthworms as they feed on decaying organic matter. The final product, typically a mixture of decomposing vegetable or food waste, bedding materials, and worm castings, is popular as a fertilizer and soil amendment.
vermiculite
A hydrated magnesium-aluminum silicate mineral resembling mica which exfoliates upon heating to form a lightweight, incombustible, and highly hygroscopic substance widely used in agriculture and horticulture as a soil amendment, where it helps to aerate soil and retain water and nutrient ions, releasing them slowly over time. These properties make it a useful growth medium for sowing seeds and propagating cuttings, either alone, mixed with compost, or just covering the surface. It is commonly used in combination with perlite.
vermiculture
The cultivation of worms, usually red wigglers and other types of earthworms, for the purpose of producing vermicompost.
vermiponics
A soil-less plant cultivation technique that combines hydroponics with vermiculture by repurposing diluted worm-bin leachate or "worm tea" from the cultivation of worms as a primary nutrient solution for plant crops. The concept is similar to aquaponics.
vernalization
vertical farming
The practice of growing crops in vertically stacked layers, usually indoors as a type of controlled-environment agriculture and by incorporating soilless farming techniques such as hydroponics, aquaponics, and aeroponics.
vineyard
A plantation or plot of land where grapevines are grown for the cultivation of grapes, particularly for winemaking.
virtual water
The total volume of freshwater used in the production of a food or non-food agricultural product, represented figuratively and in most cases estimated rather than directly measured. Virtual water may include the water physically embodied in the product itself (e.g. inside a fruit) as well as any water used during production which does not ultimately become part of the product (e.g. all water consumed in the process of irrigation, whether actually uptaken by the crop or not).
viticulture

The practice and study of the cultivation of grapes, especially for use in winemaking.
volunteer
Any plant, especially a feral crop plant or crop descendant, that grows in an agricultural field or garden unintentionally, rather than by deliberate planting by a farmer or gardener. Volunteers often grow from seeds that have been dispersed by the wind or animals or inadvertently mixed into compost. Unlike weeds, volunteers are not necessarily unwanted, and may even be encouraged to grow, especially if they show desirable characteristics that can be selected to produce new cultivars.

== W ==
walking tractor

A self-propelled, two-wheeled tractor vehicle with a single axle, designed to pull and supply power to any of a variety of agricultural implements which are mounted upon or towed behind it, including ploughs, seeders, cultivators, harvesters, or other trailers, with the operator either walking behind it or riding the implement being towed. These tractors, usually much smaller and cheaper than four-wheeled tractors, are best suited for small fields and relatively light-duty tasks.
wares
Potatoes grown or marketed for human consumption, as opposed to those grown for seed; or the largest, highest-quality potatoes that are separated from smaller, lower-quality chats during post-harvest sorting.
warm-up ration
A ration of grain and/or silage fed to free-range cattle to prepare them for placement in a feedlot, where they will be fed on similar rations consisting entirely of processed feed.
water rights
The right of a landowner to make use of the banks, bed, or waters of a water source, e.g. a river, stream, pond, spring, or underground aquifer. The water source need not necessarily be contained within or border on the user's property, as human-made reservoirs, aqueducts, and other water distribution systems have made it possible to allocate water to places outside of the source's natural drainage basin. Water rights are of major significance for managing irrigation, especially in arid regions, though the legal principles regulating access and usage vary widely by jurisdiction.
water wheel
A mechanical device that converts the kinetic energy of flowing or falling water into mechanical energy, generally a series of blades, paddles, or buckets attached to the outer rim of a wooden or metal wheel which the water in a natural or artificial channel pushes against, causing the wheel to turn and thereby providing a drive mechanism that can be used to perform useful work such as grinding grain into flour in a gristmill, grinding wood into pulp for papermaking, and pounding plant fibers for clothmaking, among many other uses.
waterlogging
The saturation of soil with water, such that water completely fills all available pores and voids in the soil, restricting air circulation in the root zone and creating an anaerobic environment. Waterlogging occurs when water is added to a field faster than it can percolate through the soil or run off from the surface, either because of excessive precipitation or over-irrigation. In some contexts such as flood irrigation, crops are intentionally waterlogged, though total saturation is usually brief. Prolonged waterlogging is usually unintentional, as it deprives plant roots of aerobic respiration and can prevent proper drainage of mineral salts, causing an undesirable increase in soil salinity; with the exception of certain crops like rice grown in paddy fields, most plants are highly intolerant of it. A variety of agricultural practices are designed to facilitate drainage and prevent waterlogging.
water-meadow
A flat area of grassland that is periodically flooded through the use of controlled irrigation in order to increase agricultural productivity. The technique is practiced primarily in Europe.
watermill

A mill powered by the movement of water through a water wheel or turbine, which drives the grinding or crushing mechanism.
water-wheel irrigation
See center-pivot irrigation.
weaning
The gradual introduction of an infant mammal to an adult diet while withdrawing the supply of its mother's milk; the infant is considered fully weaned, and may be called a weanling, when it is no longer nursed on any breast milk. More generally the term can also refer to the physical separation of a calf from its mother for any reason, usually by putting them in different herds.
weanling

An animal which has recently been weaned, especially a young horse, usually between six months and one year of age. The term is also sometimes used to refer to newly weaned cattle and swine.
weed
Any plant considered undesirable in a particular context, growing where it conflicts with human preferences, needs, or goals. Plants considered weeds may include those that are hazardous to humans or animals; harbor pests or diseases; are difficult to control in managed environments; are aesthetically unappealing; or are simply a general nuisance, having negative characteristics that outweigh their positive ones. Such plants tend to reproduce quickly and produce large numbers of seeds, and often have biological characteristics that allow them to thrive in disturbed environments or that make them difficult to eradicate. Weed control is of great importance in agriculture and horticulture, since weeds may compete with cultivated crops for soil, sunlight, water, nutrients, and other resources and cause significant losses in crop yields.
weed control
A form of pest control which attempts to stop or reduce the growth and proliferation of weeds in areas where they are not wanted (such as in agricultural fields or gardens), generally with the aim of reducing their competition with desirable flora or fauna (such as domesticated crop plants or livestock) or, outside of agricultural contexts, of preventing non-native plant species from invading and damaging natural ecosystems by competing with native species. Methods of controlling existing weed populations include manually or mechanically damaging or removing them, smothering them with mulch, deeply tilling or solarizing the soil, burning them, or applying postemergent chemical herbicides. Weed control may also encompass prophylactic measures intended to prevent weeds from invading and germinating in areas where they are not yet growing, such as applying preemergent herbicides or practicing long-term strategies such as periodically rotating crops or fallowing the land.
weed of cultivation
Any plant considered a weed that is well-adapted to environments in which the land is cultivated for growing some other plant. See also crop weed.
weeder
Any of a variety of hand-operated, towed, or power-driven agricultural implements used to pull, cut, dig, or otherwise remove undesirable plants from an area intended for cultivation.
weeding
The destruction or removal of weeds by manual or mechanical means, often with the use of implements such as hoes or cultivators, but also simply by manually pulling them from the ground; or, in the broadest sense, any type of weed control applied to existing populations of weeds, including chemical herbicides.
wether
A castrated male goat or sheep.
wet-milling
A milling operation in which plant material containing seeds is steeped in water, with or without sulfur dioxide, in order to soften the seed kernels and separate the material into its various components. The technique is commonly used to convert maize into products that can be used as animal feed.
wheat middlings (WM)

A byproduct of the milling of wheat consisting of all components of the wheat kernel remaining after the flour portion is separated, generally a mixture of both coarse and fine particles including screenings, bran, germ, shorts, red dog, and offal from other mill streams. Sometimes these components are further sorted into their own separate fractions, though they are also commonly recycled into a single combined fraction representing approximately 25–30 percent of the original grain. Wheat middlings are inexpensive and rich in protein, lipids, digestible fiber, phosphorus, and many vitamins and minerals, making them a popular animal feed.
wheatings

A byproduct of the milling of wheat consisting of brans of various sizes and varying amounts of attached endosperm, commonly used as animal feed. See also wheat middlings.
wigging
The shearing of wool from around the eyes and face of a sheep.
wild hay
Hay cut from wild or native grasses, as opposed to tame hay, which is cut from cultivated crops.
wildcrafting
The human practice of foraging for uncultivated plants or fungi from their natural or "wild" habitats, primarily for food or medicine.
wildling
A crop seedling which has begun growing, unintentionally, outside of managed agricultural lands or the area where it was intended to be cultivated.
wilting point
See permanent wilting point.
windbreak

One or more rows of closely spaced trees or shrubs planted in such a way as to provide shelter from the wind to an adjacent agricultural field, thereby protecting the area from excessive cold and soil erosion. Windbreaks commonly take the form of hedgerows planted around the edges of fields on farms, but may also be made from artificial materials such as large canvas panels. Aside from decreasing wind speeds, they may also be designed to separate farms from motorways or to collect snowdrifts that will provide water to dry farmland when the snow melts in the spring.
windmill
A mill powered by the wind, using large vanes called sails or blades to catch the movement of the air and convert it into rotational energy which drives a turbine. Traditionally, windmills were used specifically as gristmills to mill grain, but in modern usage the term may encompass many other wind-powered devices which are not used for milling.
windrow
A row of cut or mown hay or small grain crop that is allowed to dry in a field before being baled, combined, or rolled. Windrows may be built deliberately after cutting, or they may form automatically as a result of the method by which the crop is mown.

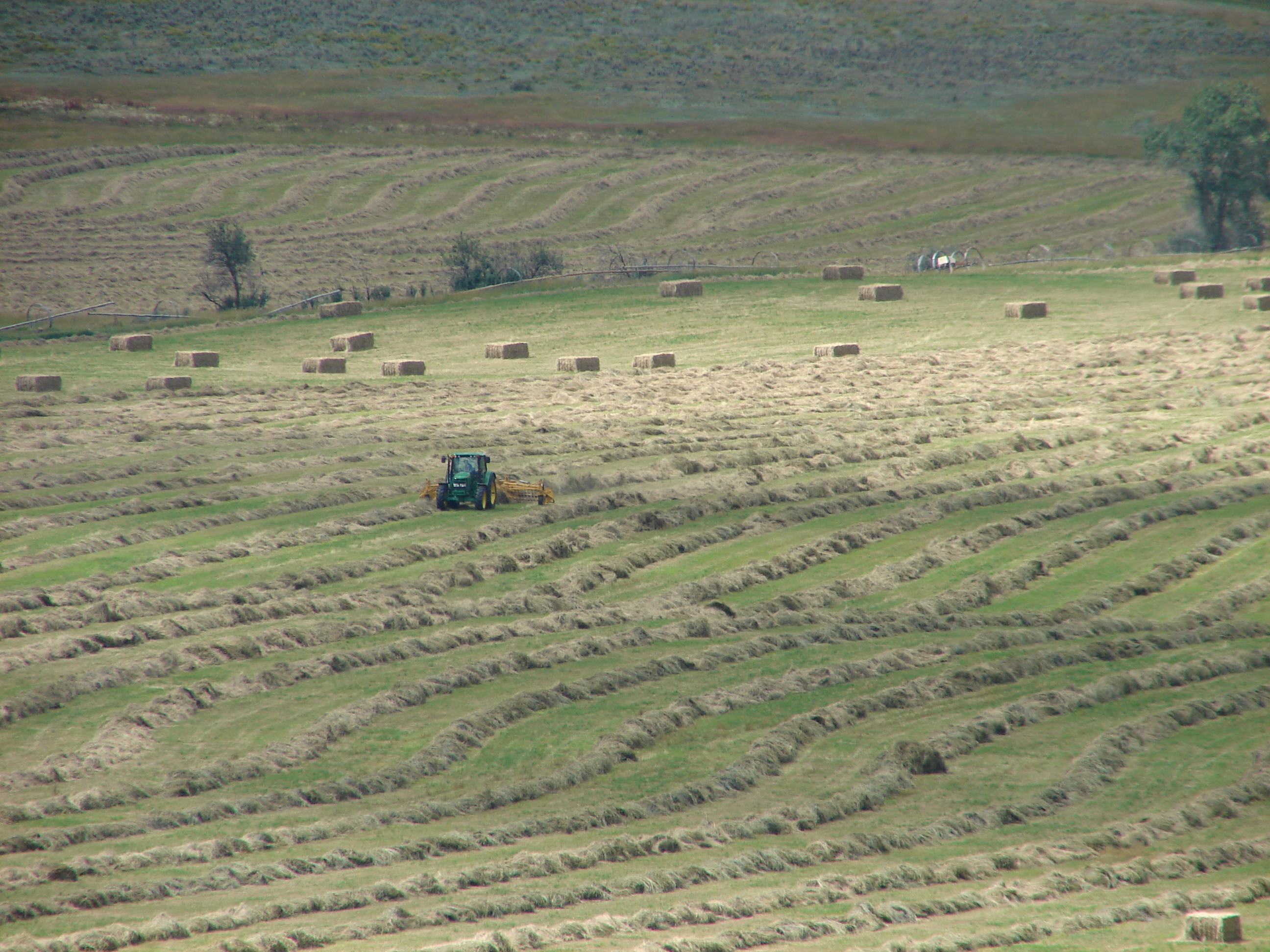
Hay windrows being turned by a tractor with a hay rake

windrower
See swather.
windsnap
The breaking of the bole or trunk of a tree by very strong winds, a type of blowdown. Compare windthrow.
windthrow
The uprooting of a tree by very strong winds, a type of blowdown. Compare windsnap.
winnowing
The process, performed either manually or mechanically, by which the economic fraction of a grain crop (i.e. the grain) is separated from the undesirable chaff. Traditional manual winnowing involves throwing the unseparated mixture into the air so that the wind blows away the lighter chaff, while the heavier grains fall back to the ground for recovery. In modern agriculture, winnowing is often entirely mechanized. It is the final of the three major steps of grain harvesting, following reaping and threshing.
winter range
Land or pasture reserved for grazing during the colder months (i.e. fall and winter), when forage is less abundant and thus fodder must often be supplied to animals to meet their feed requirements. More generally, the term may describe the areas occupied or frequented during the cold season by livestock or wild animals that migrate seasonally between higher, cooler elevations in the summer and lower, warmer elevations in the winter. Contrast summer range.
winter wheat
Any variety of wheat that is planted in the autumn or early winter in order to be harvested the following summer, as opposed to spring or summer wheat. After planting, winter wheat germinates and develops briefly but then enters a period of dormancy during the winter months in which it only grows vegetatively, before resuming its normal growth and reproductive cycle in the spring. These varieties are naturally tolerant of cold temperatures and make it possible for farmers to produce crops year-round instead of being restricted to the summer growing season.
woodlot
A small parcel of forested land, usually less than 1,000 acres (400 hectares), used for small-scale production of forest products rather than large-scale industrial logging. Woodlots are often a component of integrated farming operations, where they serve as a source of building materials, fuelwood, fodder, and other agroforestry products which may be sold to generate additional income, as shelters or seasonal pastures for livestock, or as windbreaks. Many woodlots are cultivated simply to make profitable use of otherwise undeveloped forest.
wool
The fiber produced by clipping and collecting hair from sheep or other mammals, including goats, rabbits, llamas, and alpacas. Animal wool is one of the major classes of fiber used in the textile industry.
wool alien
A plant species, especially a non-native plant or weed, which has been unintentionally introduced to a particular place as a result of activities related to the manufacture of wool products. This usually occurs when a seed, bur, or even a whole plant becomes entangled in the wool of a sheep or other wool-bearing animal and then survives shearing, transportation of the shorn wool, and cleaning at a refinery, where impurities in the wool are removed and discarded such that intact plant propagules are able to germinate and establish themselves in new habitats. Wool aliens are commonly found near woollen mills or in fields or orchards where byproducts of the wool cleaning process have been repurposed as soil conditioners.
woolshed
See shearing shed.
worming
See deworming.

== X ==
xeriscaping
The practice of gardening or landscaping so as to reduce or eliminate the need for supplemental water from irrigation. Xeriscaping requires the selection of plants whose natural requirements are appropriate to the local climate, with a particular emphasis on water conservation, and focuses on designing and maintaining the land in such a way as to avoid losing water to evaporation and runoff. See also dryland farming.

== Y ==
yean
To give birth. The term is used especially of sheep and goats.
yeanling
A newborn sheep or goat (i.e. a lamb or kid).
yearling
A male or female horse, donkey, bovine animal, or any other domestic mammal that is too young to breed, generally between one and two years of age.
yield

yield mapping
The preparation of agricultural maps using data obtained from physical sensors (known as yield monitors) attached to agricultural machinery such as combines or tractors, in combination with precise position information from satellite or GIS technologies, in order to visualize and study the spatial variation of variables such as crop yield and moisture content across an agricultural field. These data are often compared with records of the application of fertilizers, pesticides, and irrigation, allowing farmers to understand how particular combinations of inputs influence the yield harvested from different parts of the same field and to develop strategies for increasing yields in future production cycles. Yield mapping is a major component of precision agriculture.
You-Pick

== See also ==
- Index of agriculture articles
- Outline of agriculture
- Outline of organic gardening and farming
- Outline of sustainable agriculture
