= Norfolk four-course system =

Method of crop rotation

The Norfolk four-course system is a method of agriculture that involves crop rotation. Unlike earlier methods such as the three-field system, the Norfolk system is marked by an absence of a fallow year. Instead, four different crops are grown in each year of a four-year cycle: wheat, turnips, barley, and clover or ryegrass.

This system was developed in the early 16th century in the region of Waasland (in present-day northern Belgium), and was popularized in the 18th century by British agriculturist Charles Townshend. The sequence of four crops (wheat, turnips, clover and barley), included a fodder crop (turnips) and a grazing crop (clover), allowing livestock to be bred year-round. The Norfolk four-course system was a key development in the British Agricultural Revolution.

== Benefits ==
The four-course system provided for greater year-round livestock productivity by allowing for continuous growth of both fodder and crops for grazing. Prior livestock ranching in Britain typically relied upon natural grasses in pastures. Prior to the adoption of the four-course system, English farmers experienced a compounding issue of soil fertility. Manure was commonly used as a natural fertilizer, providing a source of organic matter and other nutrients, helping to enrich farmland and improve crop productivity. Difficulty in providing feed for livestock due to a lack of pastures prevented the expansion of herds, which hampered the ability for farmers to fertilize their fields with manure. The adoption of turnips as a fodder crop provided plentiful feed for livestock, increasing productivity of animal products and manure. Turnips have deeper roots than traditional cereal crops such as wheat and barley. When grown in the four-course system, turnips allowed farmers to extract nutrients from deeper in the soil than conventional cereal crops. When consumed by livestock and excreted as manure, or left in the soil by remnants of the crop, these nutrients are recycled and made available to future rotations.

The adoption of clovers and other grazing crops in the four-course system also benefitted livestock ranching. Growth of both fodder and grazing crops on farmland helped to reduce the dependency on pasturage, allowing for English farmers to expand their herds more freely. These crops, particularly clovers and ryegrass, are legumes, a family of plants traditionally used for nitrogen fixation. Nitrogen based compounds in the soil are essential for plant growth. When grown as part of the four-course system, clover and ryegrass served to replenish the nitrogen used by preceding cereal crops. This increased crop productivity and reduced the risk of soil depletion. The use of legumes was not a innovation introduced by the four-course system; previous systems of crop rotation, such as the three-field system, relied upon other legumes to provide the same benefits.

== See also ==
- Convertible husbandry
- Crop rotation
- Two-field system
- Three-field system
