= British Agricultural Revolution =

Mid-17th to late 19th century revolution centred around agriculture

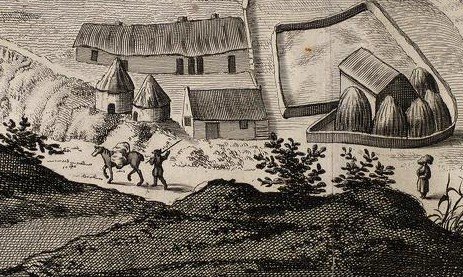
1693 illustration of a farm in the Scottish Lowlands

The British Agricultural Revolution, or Second Agricultural Revolution, was an unprecedented increase in agricultural production in Britain arising from increases in the productivity of labour and land between the mid-17th (or earlier) and late 19th centuries. Agricultural output grew faster than the population over the hundred-year period ending in 1770, and thereafter productivity remained among the highest in the world.

This increase in the food supply contributed to the rapid growth of the population in England and Wales, from 5.5 million in 1700 to over 9 million by 1801, though domestic production gave way increasingly to food imports in the 19th century as the population almost quadrupled to over 35 million.

From 1700 to 1850, agricultural productivity per labourer increased by a factor of 2.5. The rise in productivity accelerated the decline of the agricultural share of the labour force, adding to the urban workforce on which industrialisation depended: the Agricultural Revolution has therefore been cited as an enabling factor for the Industrial Revolution.

However, historians continue to dispute when exactly such a "revolution" took place and of what it consisted. Rather than a single event, G. E. Mingay states that there were a "profusion of agricultural revolutions, one for two centuries before 1650, another emphasising the century after 1650, a third for the period 1750–1780, and a fourth for the middle decades of the nineteenth century". This has led more recent historians to argue that any general statements about "the Agricultural Revolution" are difficult to sustain.

One important change in farming methods was the move in crop rotation to turnips and clover in place of fallow under the Norfolk four-course system. Turnips can be grown in winter and are deep-rooted, allowing them to gather elements unavailable to shallow-rooted crops. Clover fixes nitrogen from the atmosphere into a form of fertiliser. This permitted the intensive arable cultivation of light soils on enclosed farms and provided fodder to support increased livestock numbers whose manure added further to soil fertility.

== Terminology ==
Called "British", the term implies that the revolution began in Britain, not that it existed solely in Britain. Other countries in Europe (including France, Prussia (Germany), and Russia), East Asia and North America followed suit in the next two centuries. The Second Agricultural Revolution was much like the Neolithic Revolution in that it occurred in many regions across the world in a short span of time.

The British origins of the revolution is the view shared by British historians. Dutch historians disagree. In the Netherlands between 1500 and 1650, the agricultural output per labourer rose by 80% leading to over 60% decline in manpower engaged in agriculture by 1650. From 1500 to 1750, the Dutch were faster than Britain in reducing the agricultural sector of population. The Netherlands were called the "school room" or "home" of the modern agricultural revolution. Notably, one of the innovations in the British Revolution was the "Dutch" light plough. English landowners and their agents who returned from exile in the Netherlands in the 17th century introduced Dutch methods and techniques.

The term "revolution" refers to increase in yields per land and labour. Innovations in agricultural technology and methods took place gradually rather than an abrupt sweeping alteration.

== Major developments and innovations ==
The British Agricultural Revolution was the result of the complex interaction of social, economic and farming technological changes. Major developments and innovations include:

- Norfolk four-course crop rotation: fodder crops, particularly turnips and clover, replaced leaving the land fallow.
- Farm machinery: Adaptation of the heavy, mould-board iron plough so that it could be pulled with fewer oxen or horses; the seed drill
- Selective breeding
- Enclosure: the removal of common rights to establish exclusive ownership of land
- Development of a national market free of tariffs, tolls and customs barriers
- Transportation infrastructures, such as improved roads, canals, and later, railways
- Land conversion, land drains and reclamation
- Increase in farms

=== Crop rotation ===
Crop yield net of seed (bushels/acre)
Year	Wheat	Rye	Barley	Oats	Peas & beans	Growth rate (%/year) ‡
1250–1299	8.71	10.71	10.25	7.24	6.03	−0.26
1300–1349	8.24	10.36	9.46	6.60	6.14	−0.032
1350–1399	7.46	9.21	9.74	7.49	5.86	0.61
1400–1449	5.89	10.46	8.44	6.55	5.42	0.08
1450–1499	6.48	13.96	8.56	5.95	4.49	0.48
1550–1599	7.88	9.21	8.40	7.87	7.62	−0.16
1600–1649	10.45	16.28	11.16	10.97	8.62	−0.11
1650–1699	11.36	14.19	12.48	10.82	8.39	0.64
1700–1749	13.79	14.82	15.08	12.27	10.23	0.70
1750–1799	17.26	17.87	21.88	20.90	14.19	0.37
1800–1849	23.16	19.52	25.90	28.37	17.85	0.63
1850–1899	26.69	26.18	23.82	31.36	16.30	—
Est. ave. seed sown	2.5	2.5	3.5– 4.3	2.5– 4.0	2.5– 3.0	

‡ Average annual growth rate of agricultural output is per agricultural worker.

Yields have had the seed used to plant the crop subtracted to give net yields. Other authors offer different estimates. (1 bushel/acre = 0.06725 tonnes/hectare)

One of the most important innovations of the British Agricultural Revolution was the development of the Norfolk four-course rotation, which greatly increased crop and livestock yields by improving soil fertility and reducing fallow.

Crop rotation is the practice of growing a series of dissimilar types of crops in the same area in sequential seasons to help restore plant nutrients and mitigate the build-up of pathogens and pests that often occur when one plant species is continuously cropped. Rotation can also improve soil structure and fertility by alternating deep-rooted and shallow-rooted plants. Turnip roots, for example, can recover nutrients from deep under the soil. As it is now known, the Norfolk four-course system rotates crops so that different crops are planted, resulting in various kinds and quantities of nutrients being taken from the soil as the plants grow. An essential feature of the Norfolk four-field system was that it used labour at times when demand was not at peak levels.

Planting cover crops such as turnips and clover was not permitted under the common field system because they interfered with access to the fields. Besides, other people's livestock could graze the turnips. During the Middle Ages, the open-field system had initially used a two-field crop rotation system where one field was left fallow or turned into pasture for a time to try to recover some of its plant nutrients. Later they employed a three-year, three field crop rotation routine, with a different crop in each of two fields, e.g. oats, rye, wheat, and barley with the second field growing a legume like peas or beans, and the third field fallow. Normally from 10% to 30% of the arable land in a three crop rotation system is fallow. Each field was rotated into a different crop nearly every year. Over the following two centuries, the regular planting of legumes in the fields that were previously fallow slowly restored the fertility of some croplands. The planting of legumes helped to increase plant growth in the empty field because of the ability of the bacteria on legume roots to fix nitrogen from the air into the soil in a form that plants could use. Other crops that were occasionally grown were flax and members of the mustard family.

Convertible husbandry was the alternation of a field between pasture and grain. Because nitrogen builds up slowly over time in pasture, ploughing up pasture and planting grains resulted in high yields for a few years. A big disadvantage of convertible husbandry was the hard work in breaking up pastures and difficulty in establishing them. The significance of convertible husbandry is that it introduced pasture into the rotation.

The farmers in Flanders (in parts of France and current day Belgium) discovered a still more effective four-field crop rotation system, using turnips and clover (a legume) as forage crops to replace the three-year crop rotation fallow year. The four-field rotation system allowed farmers to restore soil fertility and restore some of the plant nutrients removed with the crops. Turnips first show up in the probate records in England as early as 1638 but were not widely used till about 1750. Fallow land was about 20% of the arable area in England in 1700 before turnips and clover were extensively grown in the 1830s. Guano and nitrates from South America were introduced in the mid-19th century, and fallow steadily declined to reach only about 4% in 1900. Ideally, wheat, barley, turnips and clover would be planted in that order in each field in successive years. The turnips helped keep the weeds down and were an excellent forage crop—ruminant animals could eat the tops and roots through a large part of the summer and winters. There was no need to let the soil lie fallow as clover would add nitrates (nitrogen-containing salts) back to the soil. The clover made excellent pasture and hay fields as well as green manure when it was ploughed under after one or two years. The addition of clover and turnips allowed more animals to be kept through the winter, which in turn produced more milk, cheese, meat and manure, which maintained soil fertility.

The mix of crops also changed: by 1870 the area under wheat rose to 3.5 million acres (1.4 million hectares), barley to 2.25 million acres (0.91 million hectares) and oats less dramatically to 2.75 million acres (1.11 million hectares), while rye dwindled to 60,000 acres (24,000 hectares), less than a tenth of its late medieval peak. Grain yields benefitted from new and better seed alongside improved rotation and fertility: wheat yields increased by a quarter in the 18th century and nearly half in the 19th, averaging 30 bushels per acre (2,080 kg/ha) by the 1890s.

=== Dutch and Rotherham swing (wheel-less) plough ===
The Dutch acquired the iron-tipped, curved mouldboard, adjustable depth plough which was invented during the Chinese Han dynasty, from the Chinese in the early 17th century. It had the advantage of being able to be pulled by one or two oxen compared to the six or eight needed by the heavy wheeled northern European plough. The Dutch plough was brought to Britain by Dutch contractors who were hired to drain East Anglian fens and Somerset moors. The plough was extremely successful on wet, boggy soil, but was soon used on ordinary land as well.

British improvements included Joseph Foljambe's cast iron plough (patented 1730), which combined an earlier Dutch design with several innovations. Its fittings and coulter were made of iron, and the mouldboard and share were covered with an iron plate, making it easier to pull and more controllable than previous ploughs. By the 1760s Foljambe was making large numbers of these ploughs in a factory outside of Rotherham, using standard patterns with interchangeable parts. The plough was easy for a blacksmith to make, but by the end of the 18th century it was being made in rural foundries. By 1770 it was the cheapest and best plough available. It spread to Scotland, North America, and France.

=== New crops ===
The Columbian exchange brought many new foodstuffs from the Americas to Eurasia, most of which took decades or centuries to catch on. Arguably the most important of these was the potato. Potatoes yielded about three times the calories per acre of wheat or barley, mainly because it took only 3–4 months to mature versus 10 months for wheat. On top of this, potatoes had higher nutritive value than wheat, could be grown in even fallow and nutrient-poor soil, did not require any special tools, and were considered fairly appetising. According to Langer, a single acre of potatoes could feed a family of five or six, plus a cow, for the better part of a year, an unprecedented level of production. By 1715 the potato was widespread in the Low Countries, the Rhineland, southwestern Germany, and eastern France, but took longer to spread elsewhere.

The Royal Society of London for Improving Natural Knowledge, established in 1660, almost immediately championed the potato, stressing its value as a substitute for wheat (particularly since famine periods for wheat overlapped with bumper periods for potatoes). The 1740 famines buttressed their case. The mid 18th century was marked by rapid adoption of the potato by various European countries, especially in central Europe, as various wheat famines demonstrated its value. The potato was grown in Ireland, a property of the English crown and common source of food exports, since the early 17th century and quickly spread so that by the 18th century it had been firmly established as a staple food. It spread to England shortly after it took hold in Ireland, first being widely cultivated in Lancashire and around London, and by the mid-18th century it was esteemed and common. By the late 18th century, Sir Frederick Eden wrote that the potato had become "a constant standing dish, at every meal, breakfast excepted, at the tables of the Rich, as well as the Poor."

While not as vital as the potato, maize also contributed to the boost of Western European agricultural productivity. Maize also had far higher per-acre productivity than wheat (about two and a half times), grew at widely differing altitudes and in a variety of soils (though warmer climates were preferred), and unlike wheat it could be harvested in successive years from the same plot of land. It was often grown alongside potatoes, as maize plants require wide spacing. Maize was cultivated in Spain since 1525 and Italy since 1530, contributing to their growing populations in the early modern era as it became a dietary staple in the 17th century (in Italy it was often made into polenta). It spread from northern Italy into Germany and beyond, becoming an important staple in the Habsburg monarchy (especially Hungary and Austria) by the late 17th century. Its spread started in southern France in 1565, and by the start of the 18th century it was the main food source of central and southern French peasants (it was more popular as animal fodder in the north).

=== Enclosure ===
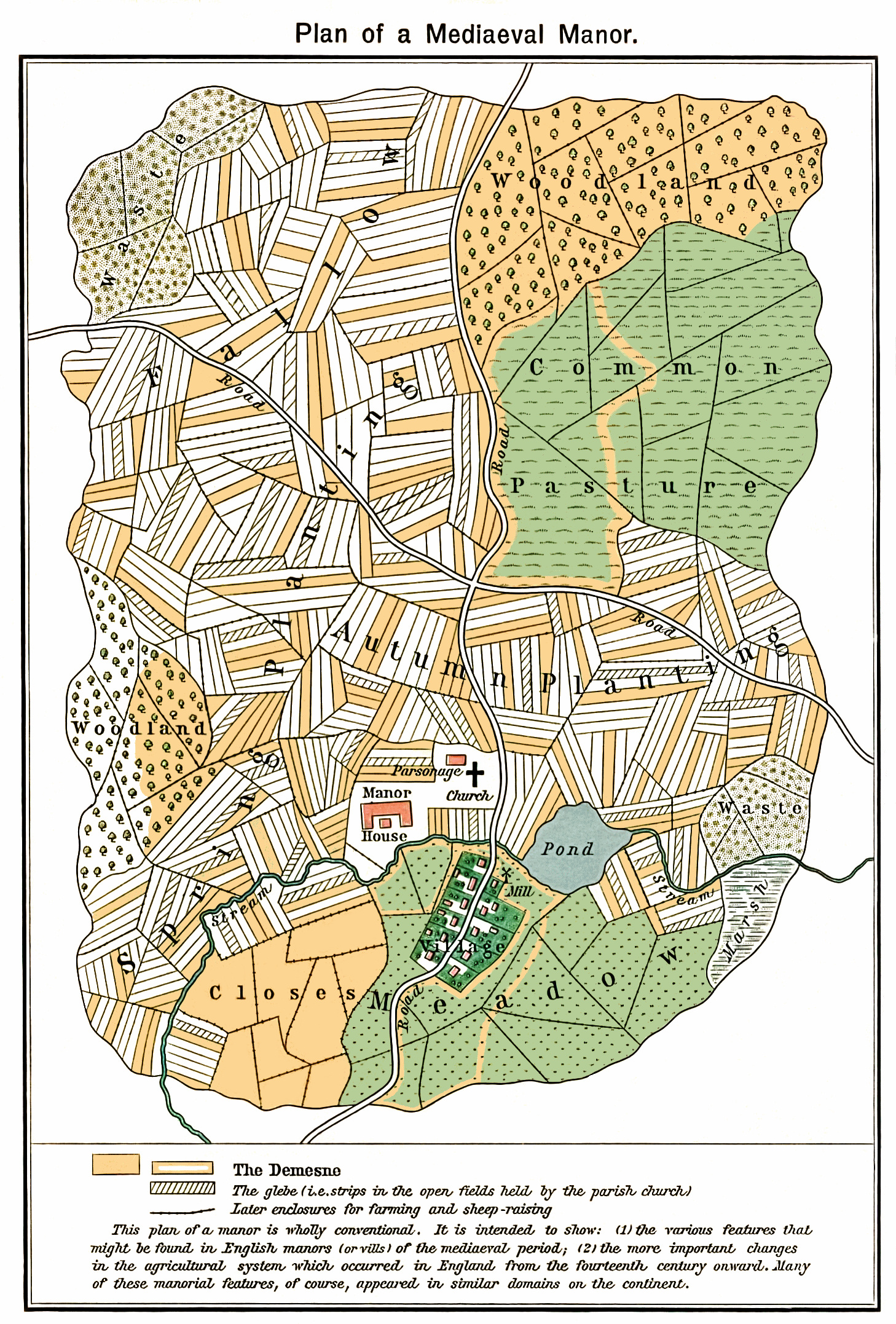
Conjectural map of a mediaeval English manor. The part allocated to "common pasture" is shown in the north-east section, shaded green.

In Europe, agriculture was feudal from the Middle Ages. In the feudal open-field system, peasant farmers were assigned individual narrow strips of land in large fields which were used for growing crops. For the right to work this land they would pay a percentage of the yield to the aristocracy or the Catholic Church, who owned the land. A separate section of land in the same area would be "held in common" as grazing pasture. Periodically the grazing land would be rotated with the crop land to allow the land to recover.

As early as the 12th century, some fields in England tilled under the open-field system were enclosed into individually owned fields. The Black Death from 1348 onward accelerated the break-up of the feudal system in England. Many farms were bought by yeomen who enclosed their property and improved their use of the land. More secure control of the land allowed the owners to make innovations that improved their yields. Other husbandmen rented property under share-tenancy agreements with the landowners. Many of these enclosures were accomplished by acts of Parliament in the 18th and 19th centuries.

The process of enclosing property accelerated in the 15th and 16th centuries. The more productive enclosed farms meant that fewer farmers were needed to work the same land, leaving many villagers without land and grazing rights. Many of them moved to the cities in search of work in the emerging factories of the Industrial Revolution. Others settled in the English colonies. The English Poor Laws were a reaction to manage these newly poor, by institutionalising measures of support and control, following similar medieval laws dealing with beggars and vagrants.

Some practices of enclosure were denounced by the Church, and legislation was drawn up against it; but the large, enclosed fields were needed for the gains in agricultural productivity from the 16th to 18th centuries. This controversy led to a series of government acts, culminating in the Inclosure (Consolidation) Act 1801 which sanctioned large-scale land reform. The process of enclosure was largely complete by the end of the 18th century.

=== Development of a national market ===
Regional markets were widespread by 1500 with about 800 locations in Britain. The most important development between the 16th century and the mid-19th century was private marketing. By the 19th century, marketing was nationwide, and the vast majority of agricultural production was for market rather than for the farmer and his family. The 16th-century market radius was about 10 miles, which could support a town of 10,000.

The next stage of development was trading between markets, requiring merchants, credit and forward sales, knowledge of markets and pricing and of supply and demand in different markets. Eventually, the market evolved into a national one driven by London and other growing cities. By 1700, there was a national market for wheat.

Legislation regulating middlemen required registration, addressed weights and measures, fixing of prices and collection of tolls by the government. Market regulations were eased in 1663 when people were allowed some self-regulation to hold inventory, but it was forbidden to withhold commodities from the market in an effort to increase prices. In the late 18th century, the idea of self-regulation was gaining acceptance. The lack of internal tariffs, customs barriers and feudal tolls made Britain "the largest coherent market in Europe".

=== Transportation infrastructure ===
High wagon transportation costs made it uneconomical to ship commodities very far outside the market radius by road, generally limiting shipment to less than 20 or 30 miles to market or to a navigable waterway. Water transport was (and indeed still is) much more energy-efficient than land transport. In the early 19th century it cost as much to transport a ton of freight 32 miles by wagon over an unimproved road as it did to ship it 3,000 miles across the Atlantic. A horse could pull at most one ton of freight on the best type of improved roads (Macadam roads). Comparatively, a single horse could pull a barge weighing over 30 tons down a canal or river; a sailing ship required no horses at all.

Commerce was aided by the expansion of roads and inland waterways. Road transport capacity grew from threefold to fourfold from 1500 to 1700, and many canals were built during a period known as Canal Mania, which enabled efficient water transport to more markets. Starting in the 1820s, railways were developed, which eventually reduced shipping costs by more than 90% compared to wagon transport.

=== Land conversion, drainage and reclamation ===
Beyond increased productivity per acre, various methods of creating more usable farmland were found. The simplest was to convert pastoral land for crops. Another way was improve land previously unfit for agriculture; the main way of doing this was through land drainage infrastructure. Across the Channel, Dutch and Flemish engineers had become experts in canal building, land drainage, and land reclamation due to the low-lying nature of their land and the consequent need to maximise its agricultural utility. Dutch engineers like Cornelius Vermuyden brought this technology to England, where it was used to massively improve drainage and create areas of new agricultural land. The Bedford Level Corporation was formed in 1663 and drained more than 95,000 acres in The Fens, making it suitable for agriculture. Nationally, the Commissions of Sewers Act 1708 revitalised the governance of land drainage in England and Wales, making land reclamation a national project. Land drainage projects increased the amount of arable land in Great Britain by 10 to 30 per cent.

Animal husbandry technology also improved. Water-meadows were introduced in the late 16th century, and allowed livestock to return to the pasture earlier in the spring. This increased livestock yields, giving more hides, meat, milk, and manure as well as better hay crops.

=== Subsistence to business ===
With the development of larger regional and eventually national markets, aided by improved transportation infrastructure, farmers were no longer dependent on their local market, and were less subject to having to sell at low prices into an oversupplied local market; instead, they could have their products shipped to London and other urban markets to sell at a better price to city-dwellers; this also reduced the effect of cartel-like behaviour and local regulations which fixed prices. Subsistence agriculture declined as more farmers started to participate in commercial agriculture.

=== Selective breeding of livestock ===
In England, Robert Bakewell and Thomas Coke systematised selective breeding, managing the reproduction of animal stock to reinforce desirable traits. Bakewell's most important breeding programme was with sheep. Using native stock, he was able to quickly select for large, yet fine-boned sheep, with long, lustrous wool. The Lincoln Longwool was improved by Bakewell, and in turn the Lincoln was used to develop the subsequent breed, the Dishley Leicester. It was hornless and had a square, meaty body with straight top lines.

Bakewell was also the first to breed cattle to be used primarily for beef. Previously, cattle were first and foremost kept for pulling ploughs as oxen or for dairy uses, with beef from surplus males as a secondary product, but he cross-bred long-horned heifers and a Westmoreland bull to eventually create the Dishley Longhorn. As knowledge of Bakewell's innovation spread, farm animals increased dramatically in size and quality. The average weight of a bull sold for slaughter at Smithfield was reported around 1700 as 370 pounds (170 kg), though this is considered a low estimate; by 1786, weights of 840 pounds (380 kg) were reported, though other contemporary indicators suggest an increase of around a quarter over the intervening century. In 1300, the average milk cow produced 100 gallons of milk annually. By 1800, this figure rose to 566 gallons.

== History ==
=== 16th to 18th century ===
Before the introduction of the seed drill, the common practice was to plant seeds by broadcasting (evenly throwing) them across the ground by hand on the prepared soil and then lightly harrowing the soil to cover the seed. Seeds left on top of the ground were eaten by birds, insects, and mice. There was no control over spacing, and seeds were planted too close together and too far apart. Alternatively, seeds could be laboriously planted one by one using a hoe and/or a shovel. Cutting down on wasted seed was important because the yield of seeds harvested to seeds planted at that time was around four or five.

The seed drill was introduced from China to Italy in the mid-16th century, where it was patented by the Venetian Senate. Jethro Tull invented an improved seed drill in 1701. It was a mechanical seeder which distributed seeds evenly across a plot of land and at the correct depth. Tull's seed drill was expensive and fragile and therefore did not have much of an impact. The technology to manufacture affordable and reliable machinery, including agricultural machinery, improved dramatically in the last half of the 19th century.

=== 19th century ===
Besides the organic fertilisers in manure, new fertilisers were slowly discovered. Massive sodium nitrate (NaNO_{3}) deposits found in the Atacama Desert, Chile, were brought under British financiers like John Thomas North and imports were started. Chile was happy to allow the exports of these sodium nitrates by allowing the British to use their capital to develop the mining and imposing a hefty export tax to enrich their treasury. Massive deposits of sea bird guano (11–16% nitrogen, 8–12% phosphate, and 2–3% potassium), were found and started to be imported after about 1830. Significant imports of potash obtained from the ashes of trees burned in opening new agricultural lands were imported.

By-products of the British meat industry like bones from the knackers' yards were ground up or crushed and sold as fertiliser. By about 1840 about 30,000 tons of bones worth £150,000 were processed every year. An unusual alternative to bones was found to be the millions of tons of fossils called coprolites found in South East England. When these were dissolved in sulphuric acid they yielded a high phosphate mixture (called "super phosphate") that plants could absorb readily and increased crop yields. Mining coprolite and processing it for fertiliser soon developed into a major industry—the first commercial fertiliser.

Higher yield per acre crops were planted as potatoes went from about 300,000 acres in 1800 to about 400,000 acres in 1850 with a further increase to about 500,000 in 1900. Labour productivity slowly increased at about 0.6% per year. With more capital invested, more organic and inorganic fertilisers, and better crop yields increased the food grown at about 0.5% per year—not enough to keep up with population growth.

Great Britain contained about 10.8 million people in 1801, 20.7 million in 1851 and 37.1 million by 1901. This corresponds to an annual population growth rate of 1.3% in 1801–1851 and 1.2% in 1851–1901, twice the rate of agricultural output growth. In addition to land for cultivation there was also a demand for pasture land to support more livestock. The growth of arable acreage slowed from the 1830s and went into reverse from the 1870s in the face of cheaper grain imports, and wheat acreage nearly halved from 1870 to 1900.

The recovery of food imports after the Napoleonic Wars (1803–1815) and the resumption of American trade following the War of 1812 (1812–1815) led to the enactment in 1815 of the Corn Laws (protective tariffs) to protect cereal grain producers in Britain against foreign competition. These laws were removed in 1846 after the onset of the Great Irish Famine in which a potato blight ruined most of the Irish potato crop and brought famine to the Irish people from 1846 to 1850. Though the blight also struck Scotland, Wales, England, and much of continental Europe, its effect there was far less severe since potatoes constituted a much smaller percentage of the diet than in Ireland. Hundreds of thousands died in the famine, and millions more emigrated to England, Wales, Scotland, Canada, Australia, Europe, and the United States, reducing the population from about 8.5 million in 1845 to 4.3 million by 1921.

Between 1873 and 1879 British agriculture suffered from wet summers that damaged grain crops. Cattle farmers were hit by foot-and-mouth disease, and sheep farmers by liver rot. The poor harvests, however, masked a greater threat to British agriculture: growing imports of foodstuffs from abroad. The development of the steam ship and the development of extensive railway networks in Britain and in the United States allowed US farmers with much larger and more productive farms to export hard grain to Britain at a price that undercut the British farmers. At the same time, large amounts of cheap corned beef started to arrive from Argentina, and the opening of the Suez Canal in 1869 and the development of refrigerator ships (reefers) in about 1880 opened the British market to cheap meat and wool from Australia, New Zealand, and Argentina.

The Long Depression was a worldwide economic recession that began in 1873 and ended around 1896. It hit the agricultural sector hard and was the most severe in Europe and the United States, which had been experiencing strong economic growth fuelled by the Second Industrial Revolution in the decade following the American Civil War. By 1900, half the meat eaten in Britain came from abroad, and tropical fruits such as bananas were also being imported on the refrigerator ships.

== Significance ==
The Agricultural Revolution was part of a long process of improvement, but sound advice on farming began to appear in England in the mid-17th century, from writers such as Samuel Hartlib, Walter Blith and others, and the overall agricultural productivity of Britain started to grow significantly only in the 18th century. It is estimated that total agricultural output grew by a factor of 2.7 between 1700 and 1870 and output per worker at a similar rate. Despite its name, the Agricultural Revolution in Britain did not result in overall productivity per hectare of agricultural area as high as in China, where intensive cultivation (including multiple annual cropping in many areas) had been practised for many centuries.

The Agricultural Revolution in Britain proved to be a major turning point in history, allowing the population to far exceed earlier peaks and sustain the country's rise to industrial pre-eminence. Towards the end of the 19th century, the substantial gains in British agricultural productivity were rapidly offset by competition from cheaper imports, made possible by the exploitation of new lands (particularly in the Western United States) and advances in transportation, refrigeration, and other technologies.

The Agricultural Revolution in other countries was a turning point too. In traditional agrarian societies, average productivity was around 120% of subsistence; that is, four households could feed five. Little manpower was available for non-agricultural activity. Once agriculture improved, however, yields jumped drastically, such that one household could feed five, reducing the workforce needed for agriculture by 75%. Large numbers of workers were made available for other forms of employment, which created the conditions necessary for the Industrial Revolution:

Industrialization and modern economic growth are basically conditioned by the level of agricultural productivity inherited from pre-modern period ... [A]n agricultural revolution and subsequent rise in agricultural productivity are often considered prerequisites for take-off of the initial spurt of industrialization.

Unprecedented population growth followed and even more explosive was the growth of the non-agricultural sector. Barrington Moore stressed the "importance of getting rid of agriculture as a major social activity" in the formation of the working class. First, "rural proletariat" appeared; later, this mass moved to cities, causing unprecedented urbanisation. When the percentage of manpower engaged in agriculture declined from 80 to 60, great social revolutions or reformations occurred (revolution from above). The result was not the French revolutionary ideal of liberty, equality, fraternity; often the result was the opposite, with stronger autocracy. But in all cases, the power shifted from land owners to industrial entrepreneurs or central-planning states, marking a "revolutionary break with the past". The ten-millennia Agrarian Age was succeeded by the Industrial Age.

== See also ==
- Agriculture in the United Kingdom § History
- Scottish Agricultural Revolution

== Sources ==
- Overton, Mark (1996). Agricultural Revolution in England: The transformation of the agrarian economy 1500-1850. Cambridge University Press. ISBN 978-0-521-56859-3.
- Temple, Robert (1986). The Genius of China: 3000 Years of Science, Discovery and Invention. Simon and Schuster.
