= Smother crop =

Crop used to smother weeds

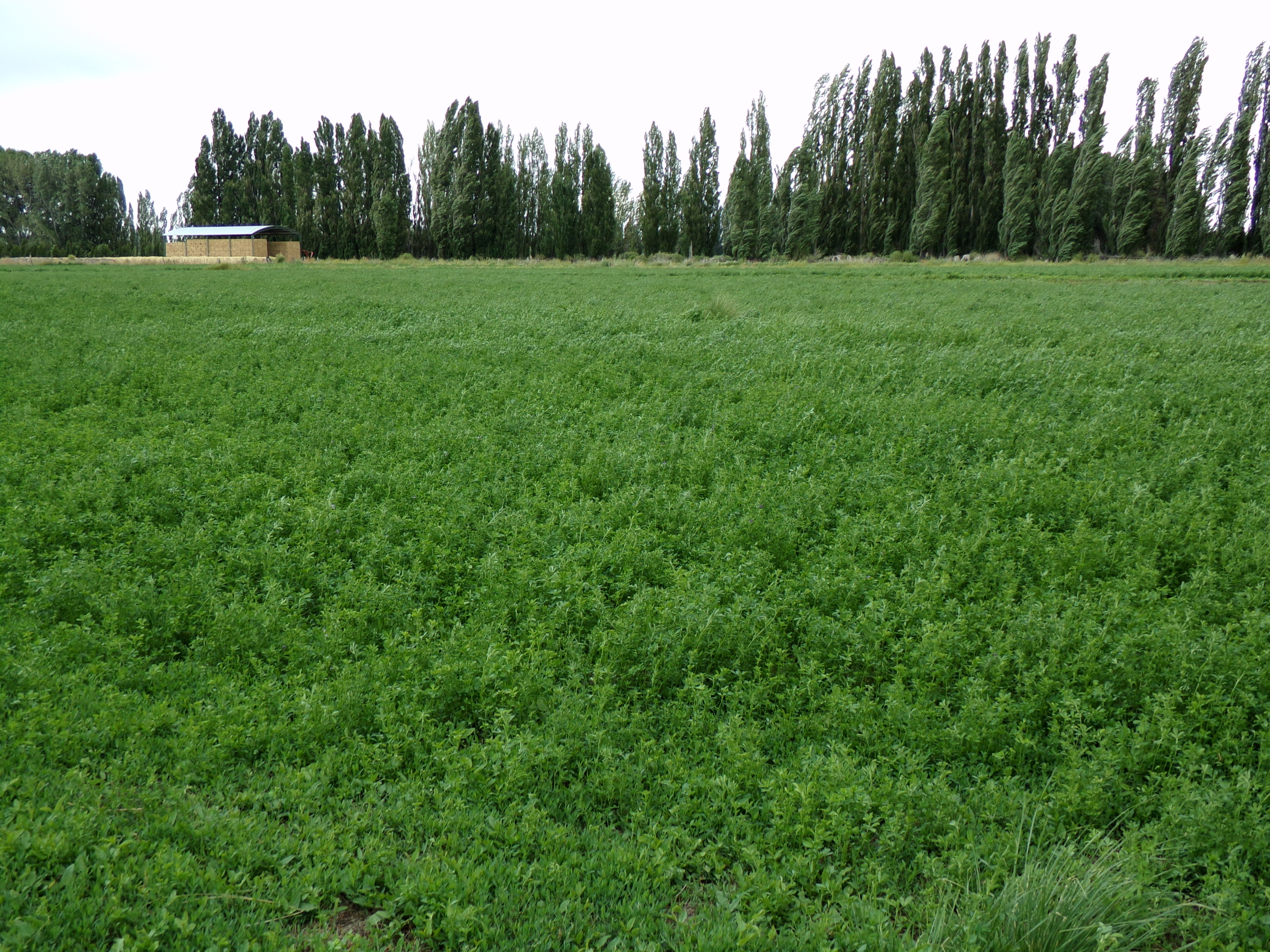
Alfalfa is used as a smother crop.

A smother crop is a thick, rapidly growing crop that is used to suppress or stop the growth of weeds which have better root systems that help them compete with weeds for water and as a result, the root systems of weeds get weak. Meanwhile, the dense top growth of the smother crop suppresses the top growth of weeds. Effectively, smother crops successfully compete with weeds for vital resources (growth, space, water, light) and inhibit their germination and growth. Once the smother crop has served its purpose, it is ploughed under along with the weakened weeds, thus providing green fertilizer. A good smother crop must compete strongly with weeds but minimally with the crop. Smother crops reduce dependence on chemical weed control, and are sometimes used in the transition to organic farming.

Secondary benefits of such crops include helping nitrogen fixation in soil (if legumes are used) and reducing soil erosion.

Alfalfa, hemp, rye, buckwheat, sorghum, Sudan grass, foxtail millet, sweetclover, marigold, silage corn are some examples of smother crops.

== See also ==
- Cover crop
- Trap crop
- Catch crop
