= Keyhole garden =

Type of vegetable patch

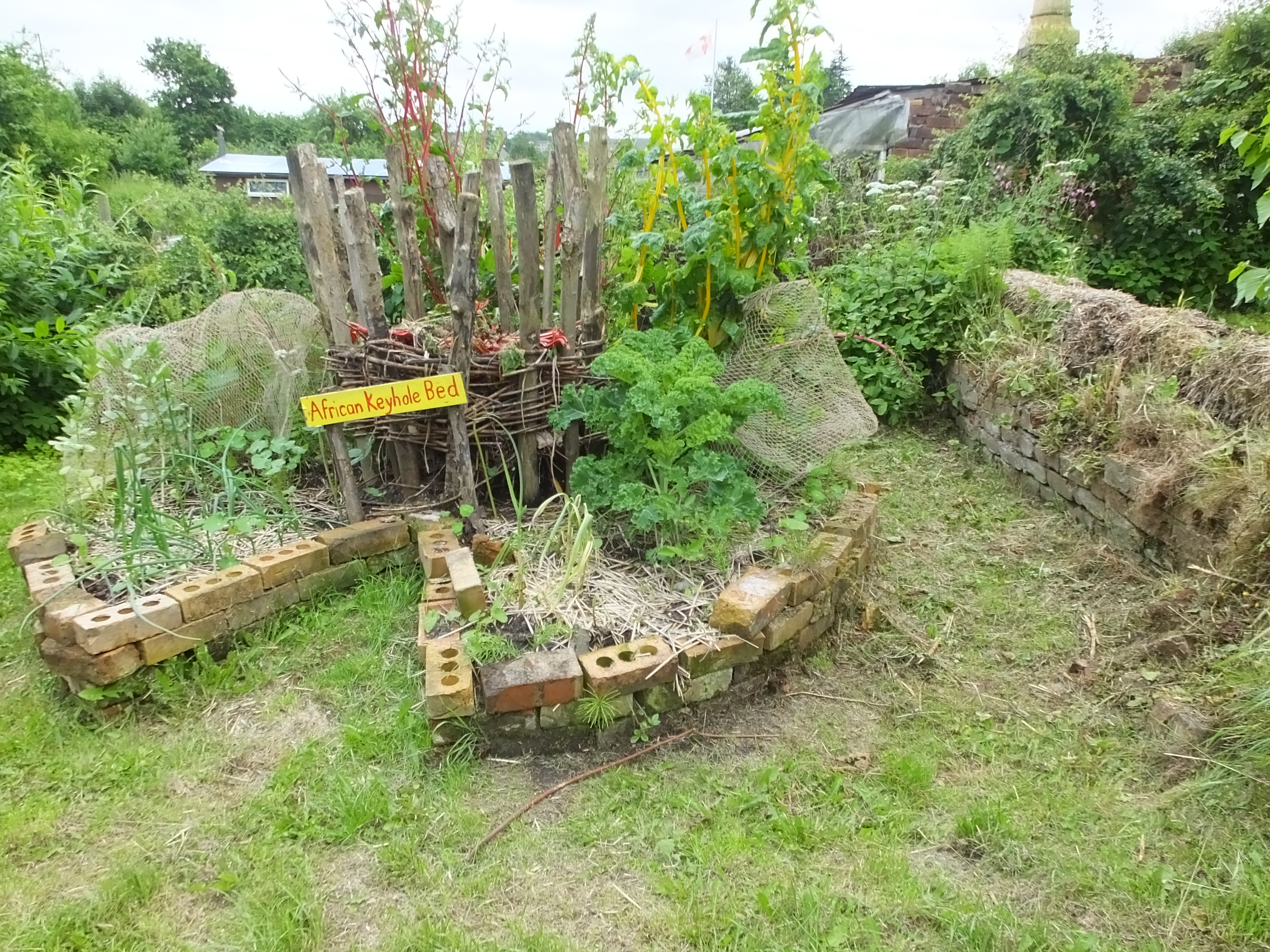
A keyhole garden at St Ann's Community Orchard, Nottingham

A keyhole garden is a two-meter-wide circular raised garden with a keyhole-shaped indentation on one side. The indentation allows gardeners to add uncooked vegetable scraps, greywater, and manure into a composting basket that sits in the center of the bed. In this way, composting materials can be added to the basket throughout the growing season to provide nutrients for the plants. The upper layer of soil is hilled up against the center basket, so the soil slopes gently down from the center to the sides. Most keyhole gardens rise about one meter above the ground and have walls made of stone. The stone wall not only gives the garden its form, but helps trap moisture within the bed. Keyhole gardens originated in Lesotho and are well adapted to dry arid lands and deserts. In Africa, they are positioned close to the kitchen and used to raise leafy greens such as lettuce, kale, and spinach; herbs; and root crops such as onions, garlic, carrots, and beets. Keyhole gardens are ideal for intensive planting, a technique in which plants are placed close together to maximize production. Plants with wide-reaching root systems, such as tomatoes and zucchini, may not perform well in a keyhole garden.

The keyhole garden was developed in Lesotho by the Consortium for Southern Africa Food Security Emergency (C-SAFE), based upon a design that originated with CARE in Zimbabwe. In the mid-1990s, Lesotho had one of the highest AIDS/HIV rates in the world. C-SAFE designed the keyhole garden for people who suffered from AIDS or were otherwise unable to tend a traditional garden. They are tall enough that people do not have to bend over while working in them, sturdy enough that a person who is weak can lean against them while they work, and small enough that the entire bed is within arm’s reach. The garden is constructed using layers of compost, manure, wood ash and other nutrient-rich materials, so they are more productive than most home gardens; they hold water making them drought-resistant. The walls can be made of common stones picked up from a field, cinderblocks, bricks, or any material strong enough to hold in the soil. Clean water is used when watering the plants on the surface, while household greywater is poured down into the compost basket.

While they are designed for people who were too sick to tend a traditional garden, because they were so productive, people in good health started building them as kitchen gardens. Here the family could grow its high-value crops using succession planting. In the end, C-SAFE helped build over 20,000 keyhole gardens, and when they returned a couple of years later, more than 90% were still in use. Today, keyhole gardens are found in many places throughout Africa, including Ethiopia, Rwanda, Kenya, Sudan, and Nigeria.

African-style keyhole gardens have been built in Texas and other places in the US. The Texas Master Gardeners Association has put on several workshops to promote them. They have modified the basic design, having standardized on a 6-foot-wide bed with a 12-inch tube made of rabbit fencing or chicken wire for the compost basket. It is common in Texas to add red-wiggler worms to the compost basket to help break down the organic matter. The term "keyhole garden" is also used in permaculture to describe a garden bed that has been laid out with one or more paths that dead-end rather than continuing through, in order to reduce the area of paths. Permaculture keyhole gardens tend to be wider and flatter than the African variety and do not generally incorporate a compost basket or compost pile built into the bed. The tall beds that incorporate compost are referred to as "banana circles" by permaculturalists.

== See also ==
- List of garden types
- Square foot gardening
