= Continuous harvest =

In agriculture, continuous harvest is the availability of a crop over an extended period during the growing season. Each crop has a harvest window during which it is ready for picking. Some are harvested by removing the whole plant, for example, cutting a head of lettuce. Others can be picked over varying periods: peas and corn may have a window of two weeks, cucumbers six or eight, tomatoes produce until the end of the season.

To provide a season-long continuous harvest of a crop with a shorter harvest window, succession planting techniques are used, including multiple plantings at different times, and planting of cultivars with different maturity dates. In this way, with effective timing, a new planting or variety of a crop is always coming into maturity as a previous one finishes.
