= Raised-bed gardening =

Form of gardening

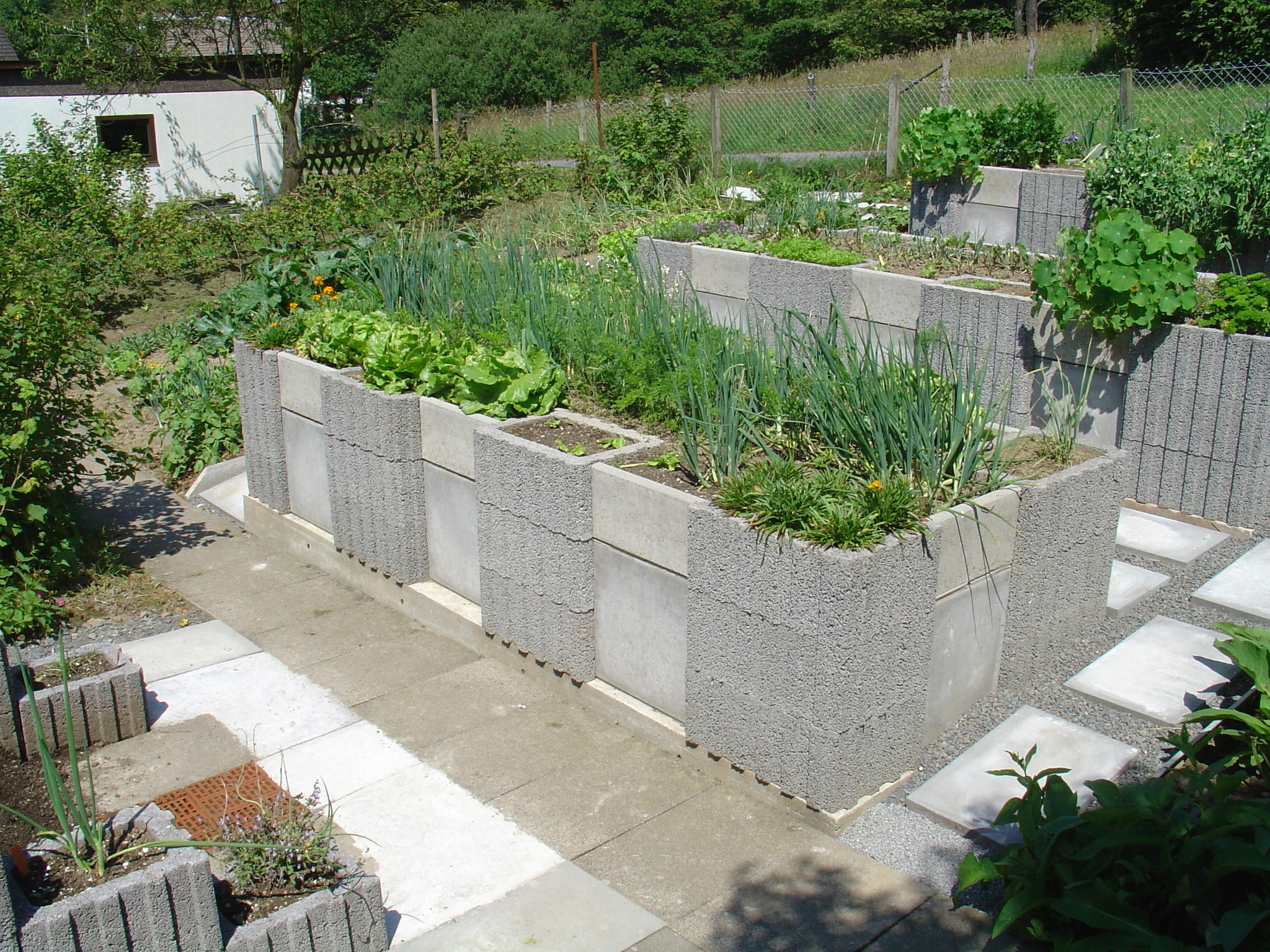
Raised bed gardening

Raised-bed gardening is a form of gardening in which the soil is raised above ground level and usually enclosed in some way. Raised bed structures can be made of wood, rock, concrete or other materials, and can be of any size or shape. The soil is usually enriched with compost.

Vegetables are grown in geometric patterns, much closer together than in conventional row gardening. The spacing is such that when the vegetables are fully grown, their leaves just barely touch each other, creating a microclimate in which weed growth is suppressed and moisture is conserved.

== Overview ==
Raised beds lend themselves to the development of complex agriculture systems that utilize many of the principles and methods of permaculture. They can be used effectively to control erosion and recycle and conserve water and nutrients by building them along contour lines on slopes. This also makes more space available for intensive crop production. They can be created over large areas with the use of several commonly available tractor-drawn implements and efficiently maintained, planted and harvested using hand tools.

This form of gardening is compatible with square foot gardening and companion planting.

Circular raised beds with a path to the center (a slice of the circle cut out) are called keyhole gardens. Often the center has a chimney of sorts built with sticks and then lined with feedbags or grasses that allows water placed at the center to flow out into the soil and reach the plants' roots.

A self watering raised bed known as a wicking bed is particularly beneficial in dry climates and are often made by converting Intermediate bulk container (IBC's).

=== Materials and construction ===
Lumber is the most common construction material for making raised beds. If using lumber treated with chromated copper arsenate or CCA (though uncommon since 2004 in the US and Europe), it is recommended to use a plastic liner between the wood and soil if the raised bed is intended for growing edibles.

Another material commonly used are railroad ties, also known as sleepers, joined with steel rods to hold them together. Another approach is to use concrete blocks, although less aesthetically pleasing, they are inexpensive to obtain and easy to use.

On the market are also prefab raised garden bed solutions which are made from long lasting polyethylene that is UV stabilized and food grade so it will not leach undesirable chemicals into the soil or deteriorate in the elements. A double skinned wall provides an air pocket of insulation that minimizes the temperature fluctuations and drying out of the soil in the garden bed. Sometimes raised bed gardens are covered with clear plastic to protect the crops from wind and strong rains. Pre-manufactured raised bed gardening boxes also exist. There are variants of wood, metal, stone and plastic.

== Benefits ==
Raised beds produce a variety of benefits: they extend the planting season, they can reduce weeds if designed and planted properly, and they reduce the need to use poor native soil. Since the gardener does not walk on the raised beds, the soil is not compacted and the roots have an easier time growing. Waist-high raised beds enable the elderly and physically disabled to grow vegetables without having to bend over to tend them.

== Gallery ==
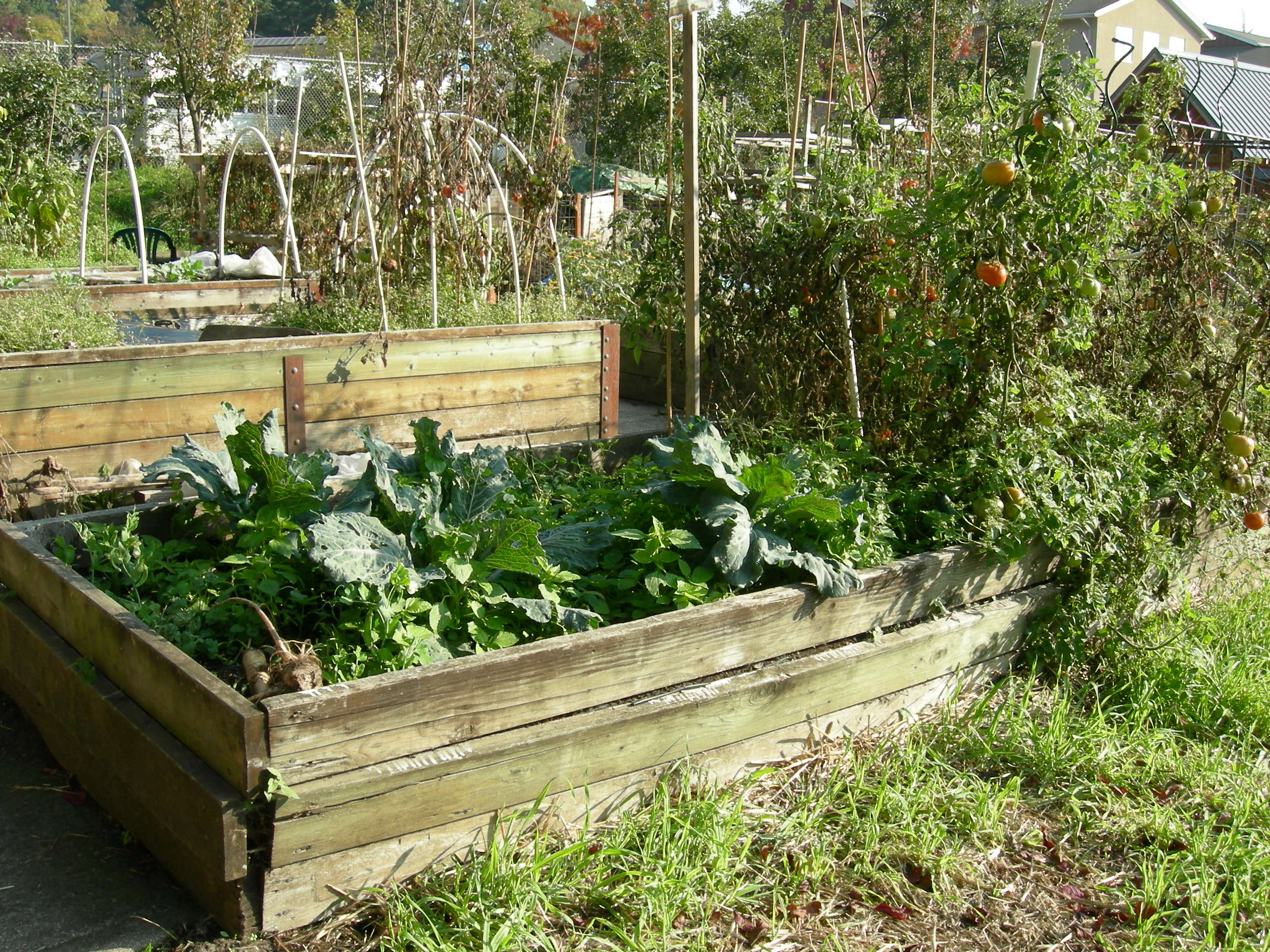
Picardo Farm, Wedgwood neighborhood, Seattle, Washington: A community allotment garden with raised beds for the physically disabled.

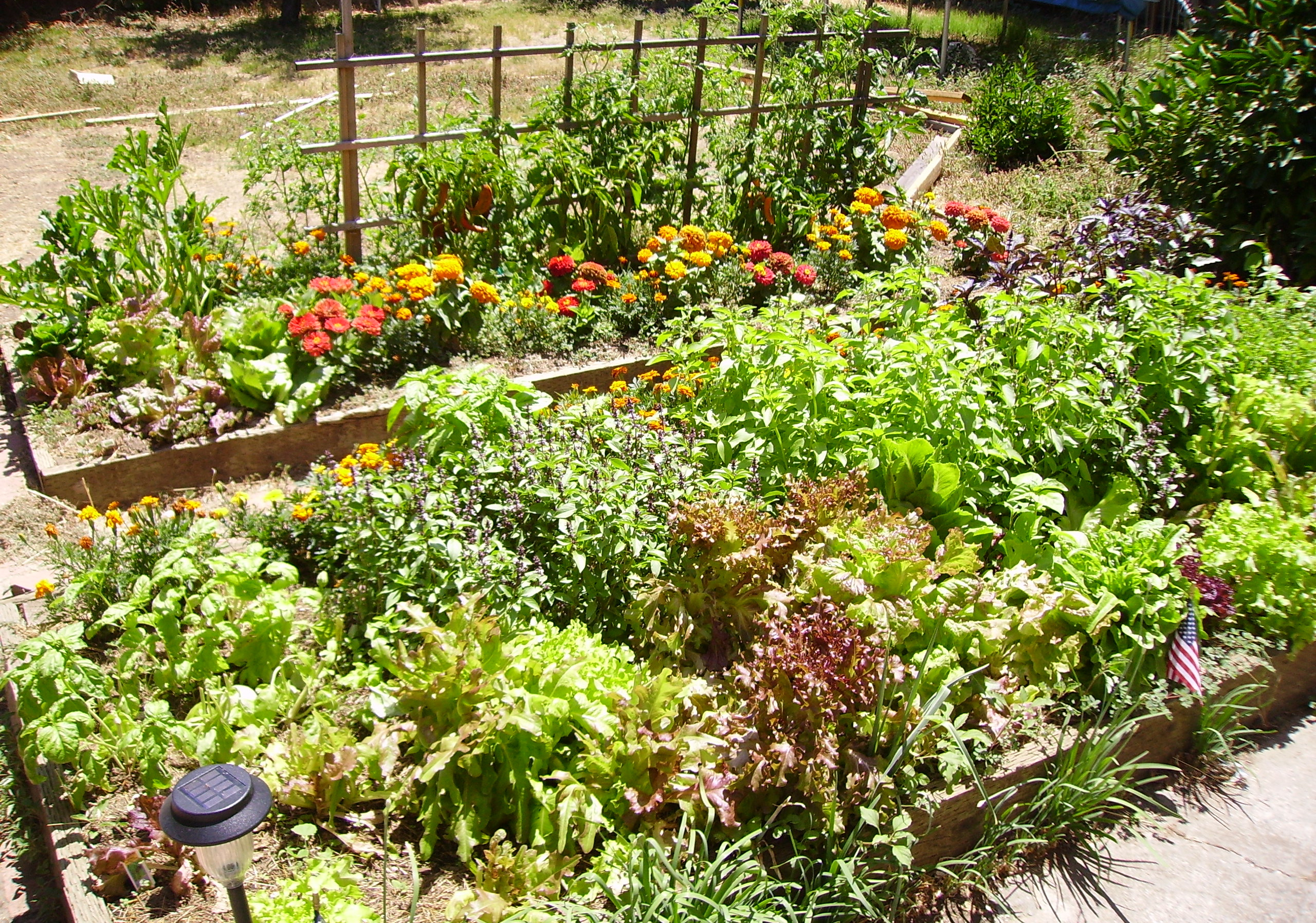
Raised garden bed of lettuce, tomatoes, basil, marigolds, zinnias, garlic chives, zucchini.

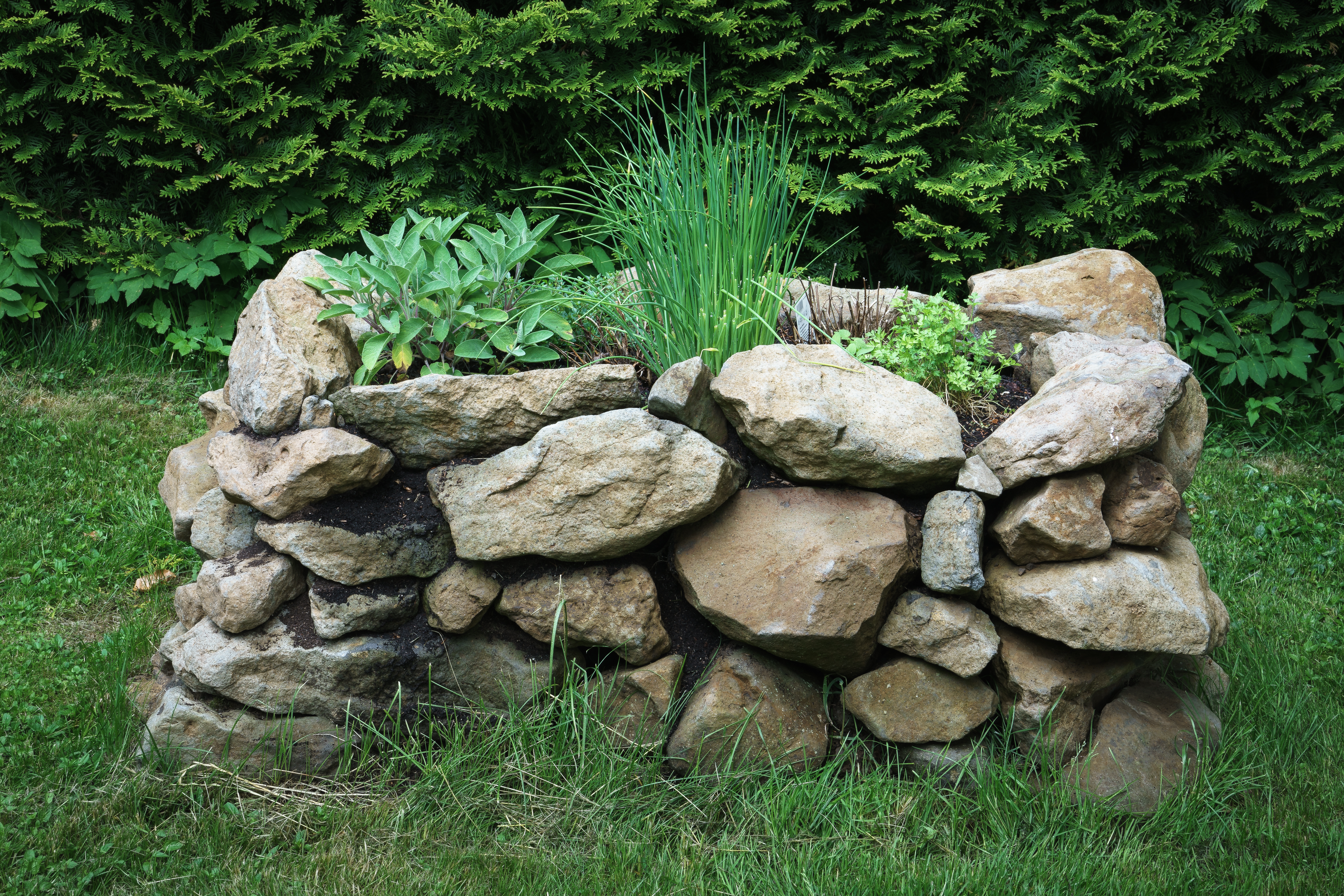
Raised garden bed with natural stones of Salvia, Chives, and Parsley.

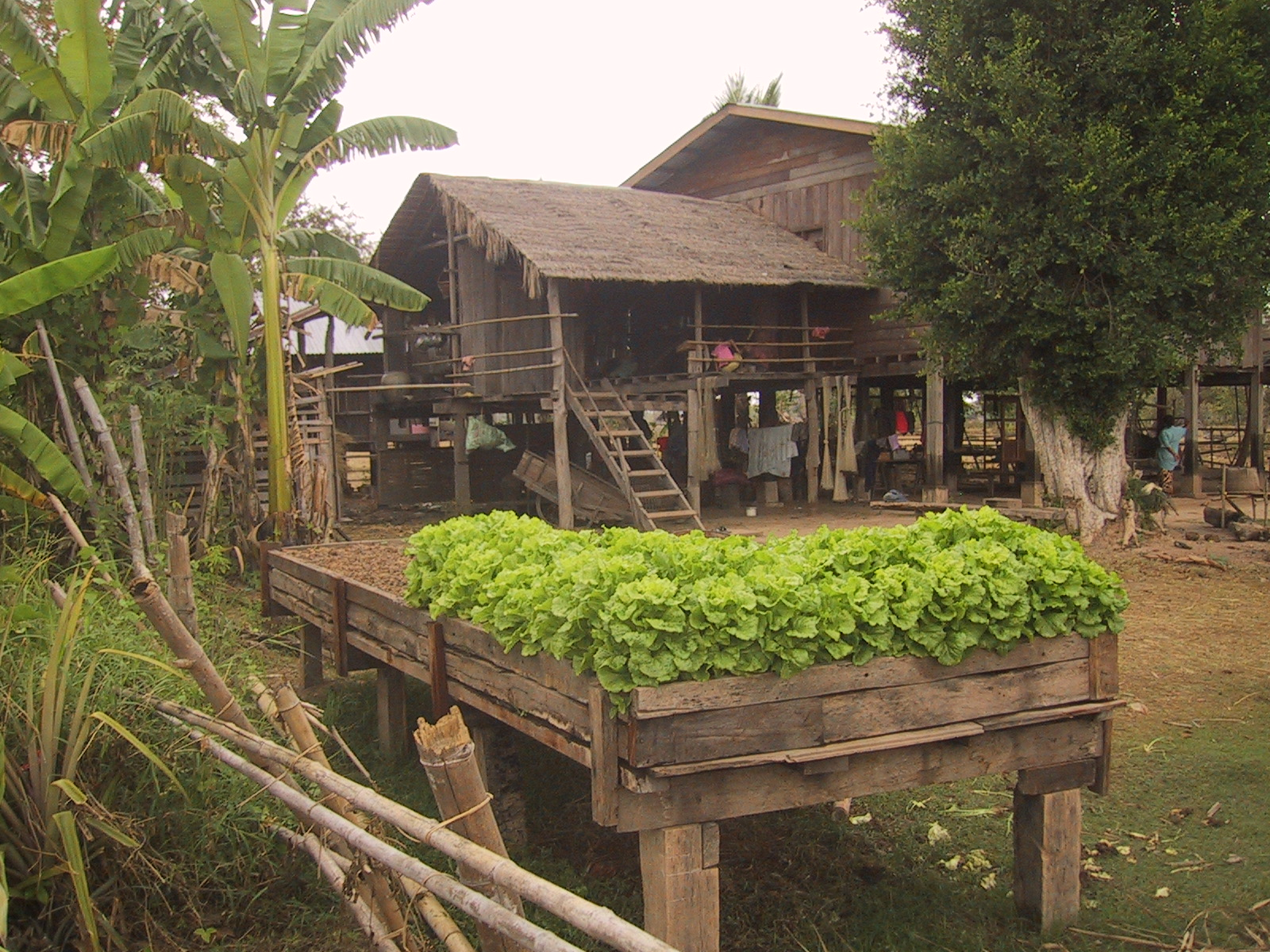
Raised garden bed with lettuce in Don Det, Laos.

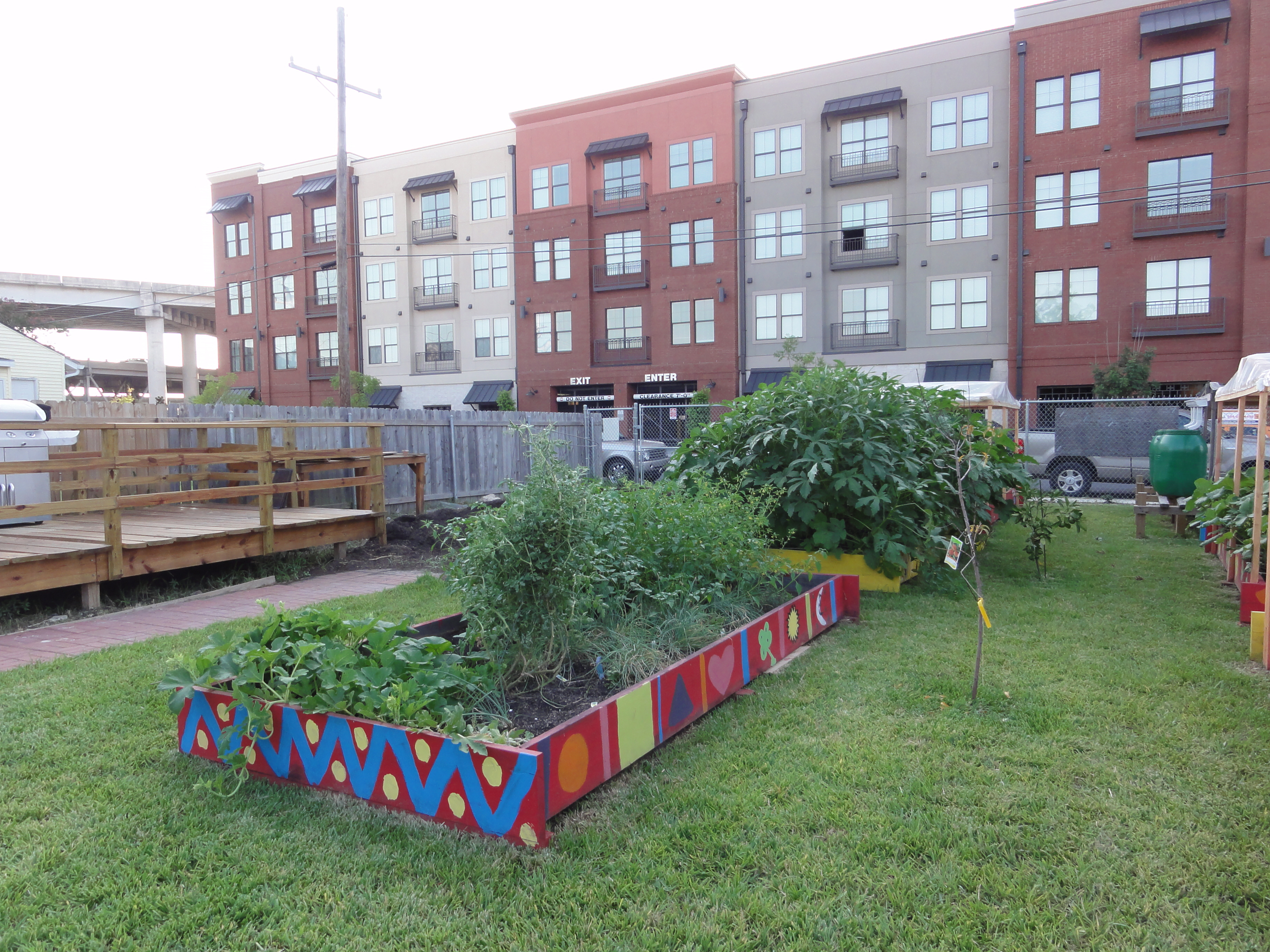
Raised garden beds with painted wooden edgings at Wise Words Community Garden in Mid-City, New Orleans.

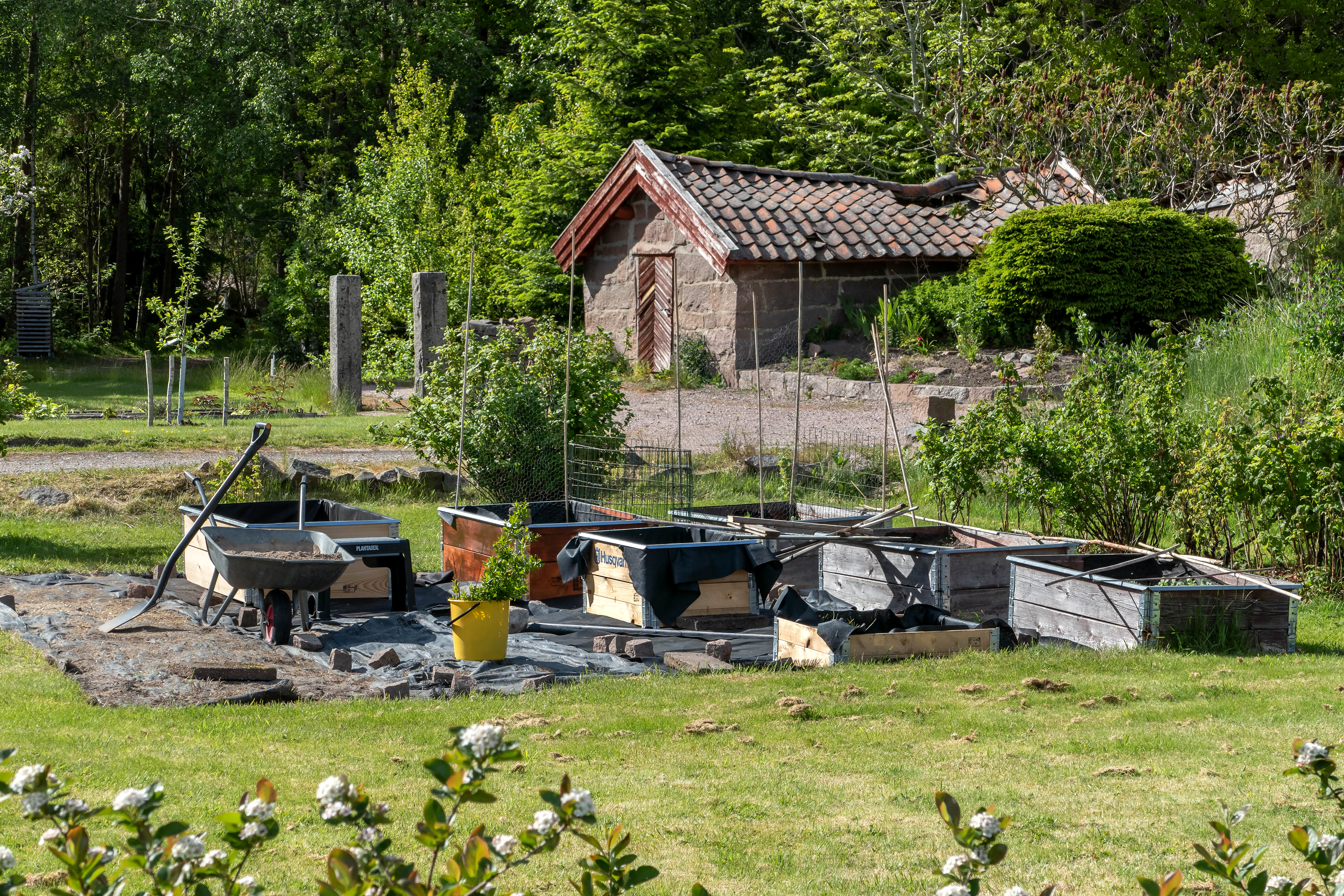
Preparing raised flower-beds in a private garden in Brastad, Sweden.

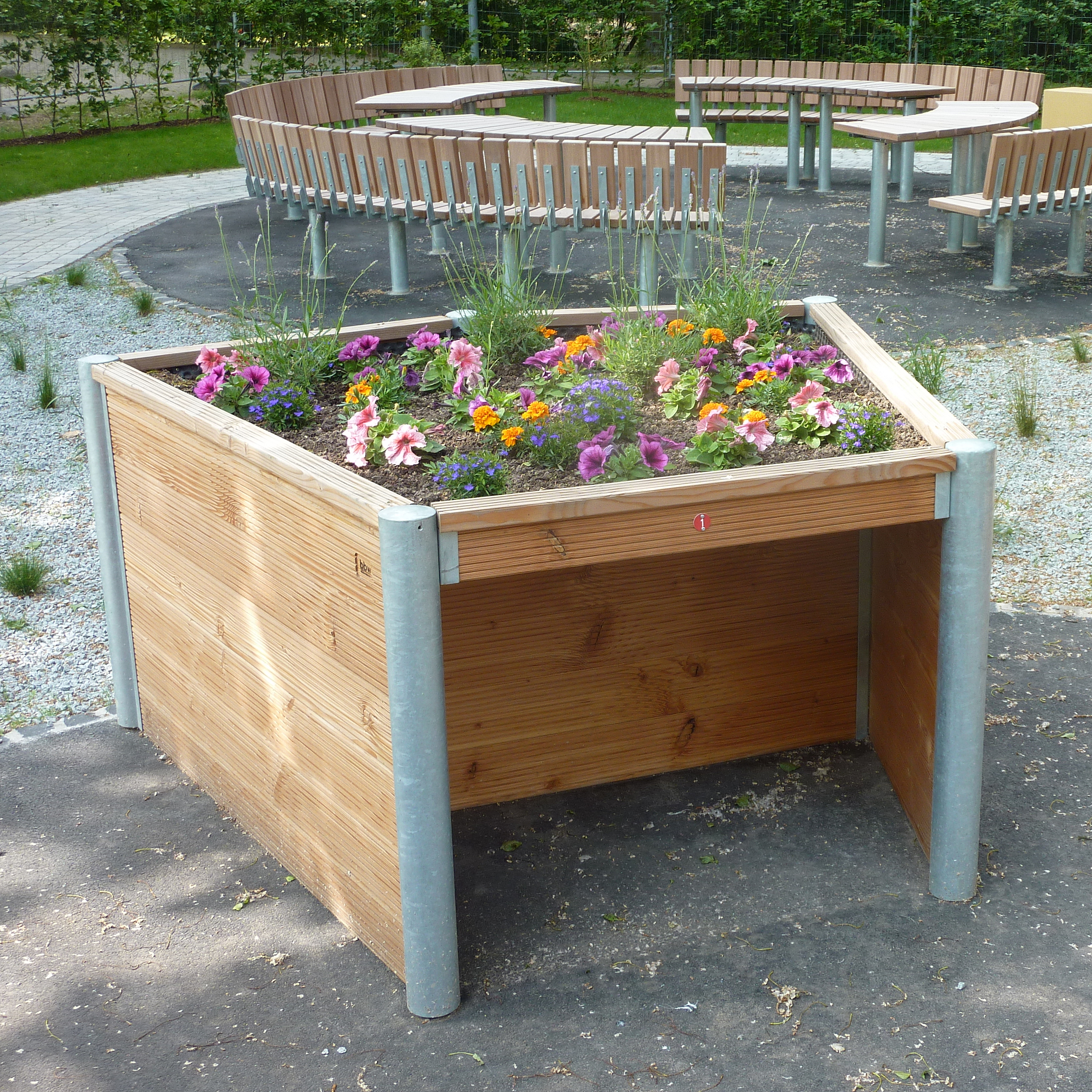
Special raised flower bed, permitting gardening in a wheelchair, in Frankfurt, Germany.

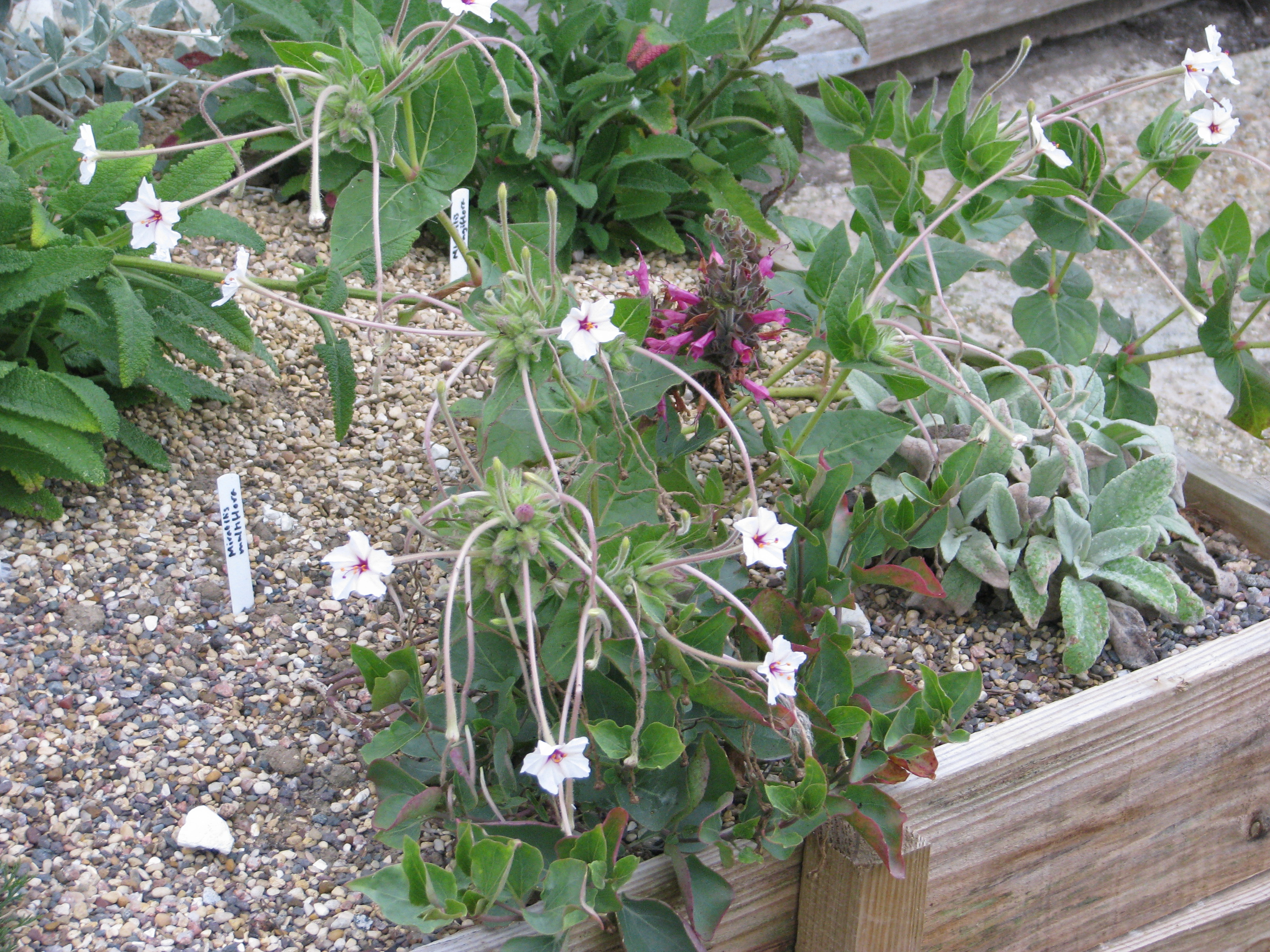
Raised rock garden bed with Mirabilis longiflora in Small Dole, England.

== Sunken gardens ==
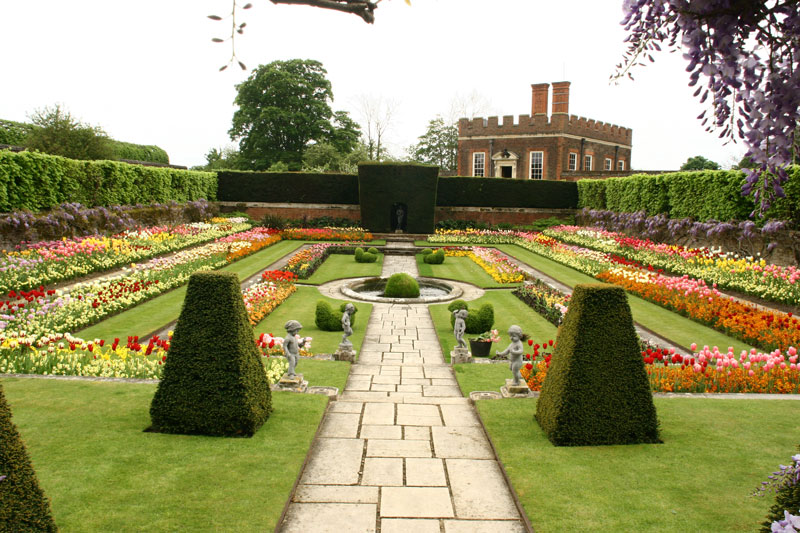
A sunken garden at Hampton Court Palace

A waffle garden is the inverse of raised beds and is a gardening method by the Zuni people. In an arid climate, clay walls are built up around the planting area and plants are watered by filling the bed "cells".

The term sunken garden usually refers to a formal traditional English garden where the garden is lower than the surrounding land, and may have multiple terraces around it and steps leading down to the garden.

== See also ==
- Keyhole garden
- Kitchen garden
- Square foot gardening
- Therapeutic garden
- Herb spiral
- Waru Waru – A traditional Quechua, pre-Inca system involving raised beds
- Hügelkultur – Another type of raised bed

== Bibliography ==
- Bird, Christopher (2001). Cubed Foot Gardening: Growing Vegetables in Raised, Intensive Beds. Lyons Press. ISBN 9781599215914. ISBN 1-58574-312-7
- Linhart, Rita & Richardson, Antoinette (2012). Raised Bed Gardening - low cost, high yield and simply done. Books on Demand. ISBN 978-3837018417. ISBN 978-3-8370-1841-7
