= Barahnaja =

Traditional Indian agricultural technique

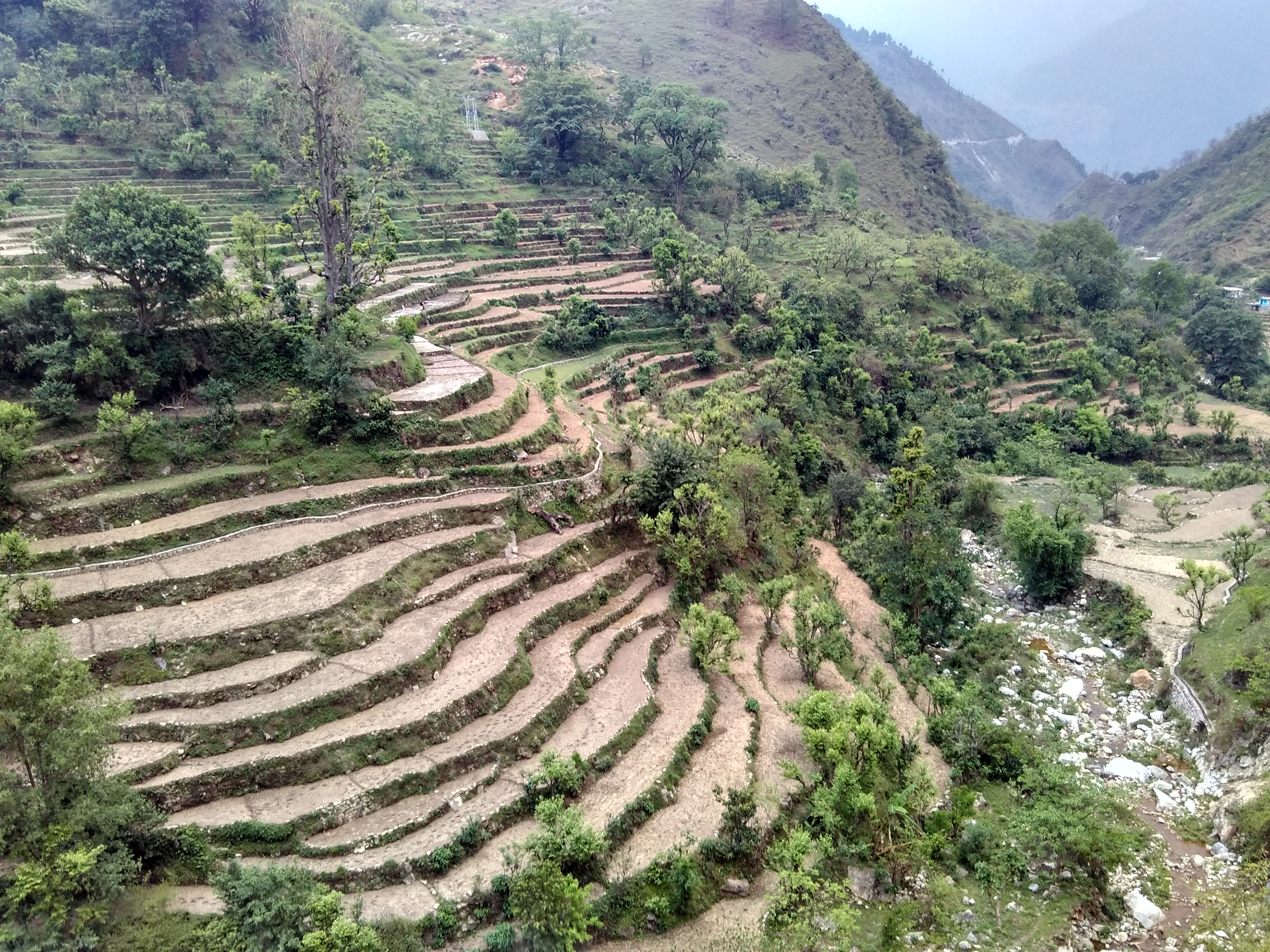
Typical terrace fields in Uttarakhand.

Barahnaja (lit. "twelve seeds") is an ancient traditional system of multiple cropping that is practised in the Indian mountainous state of Uttarakhand. The term literally means "twelve seeds or food grains" in Garhwali, and refers to the twelve types of crops that are grown together in a single field to enhance soil fertility, food security, and ecological balance. There are no pesticides or fertilizers involved in this method, and many crops in the barahnaja system have medicinal uses. This sustainable and traditional farming method is climate-resilient and has been recognized as "organic by default".

== Types of crops ==
The twelve major crops that are grown under the barahnaja system include:

1.Mandua/Ragi (finger millet)
2. Ramdana (amaranth)
3. Rajma (kidney bean)
4. Ogal (buckwheat)
5. Urad (black gram)
6. Moong (green gram)
7. Gahat/Kulath (horsegram)
8. Bhat (soyabean)
9. Lobiya (Cowpea)
10. Kheera/kakdi (cucumber)
11. Bhangjeera (hemp)
12. Jakhiya (cleome)

Although the term means "twelve seeds or food grains", this can change depending on the local terrain and climate, and farmers can grow as many as 20 different crops on the field. All these are grown without the use of pesticides or fertilizers.

== Benefits of the farming method ==
The traditional farming method of barahnaja has been widely studied, and is known to have the following advantages: suitable for ecologically fragile regions; sustainable and self-sufficient; preventing soil erosion; food security as threat of widespread crop failure is minimised; health benefits to consumers with its chemical-free approach; enhances soil health and fertility.
