= Succession planting =

Agricultural planting method

In agriculture, succession planting refers to several planting methods that increase crop availability during a growing season by making efficient use of space and timing.

There are four basic approaches, that can also be combined:

- Two or more crops in succession: On the same field where one crop has just been harvested, another is planted. The duration of the growing season, the environment, and the choice of crop are important variables. A crop that prefers the chilly spring months can be followed by a crop that prefers the summer heat.
- Same crop, successive plantings: Several smaller plantings are made at timed intervals, rather than all at once. The plants mature at staggered dates, establishing a continuous harvest over an extended period. Lettuce and other salad greens are common crops for this approach. Within a small garden or home garden, this method is useful in circumventing the initial large yield from the crop and rather providing a steady, smaller yield that may be consumed in its entirety. This is also known as relay planting.
- Two or more crops simultaneously: Non-competing crops, often with different maturity dates, are planted together in various patterns. Intercropping is one pattern approach; companion planting is a related, complementary practice. This method is also known as Interplanting: The practice of growing two types of plants in the same space. Interplanting requires a certain amount of preplanning and knowledge of the maturity dates of different types of vegetables. It has been noted that successful interplanting and intensive gardening is done in raised beds within the planting areas. Planting two or more non-competing crops may raise issues with soil-borne diseases and insects that only affect one type of plant. Depending on how close the interplanting varieties are, crop failure is a possibility.
- Same crop, different maturity dates: Several varieties are selected, with different maturity dates: early, main season, late. Planted at the same time, the varieties mature one after the other over the season.

These techniques can be used to design complex, highly productive cropping systems. The more involved the plan, the more detailed knowledge is required of the specific varieties and how they perform in a particular growing location. A number of tertiary institutions have written about the advantages of succession planting and outlined extensive guides to this bio intensive style of small scale crop farming. There are a numerous differences in guides to succession planting due to the diverse climate and soil conditions experienced around the world. There are significant differences between cold weather succession planting and warm weather succession planting.

The term "succession planting" usually appears in literature for home gardening and small-scale farming, although the techniques apply to any scale. Some definitions include one or more, but not all of the four techniques described above.

Succession planting is often used in organic farming. Multiple cropping describes essentially the same general method. A catch crop refers to a specific type of succession planting, where a fast-growing crop is grown simultaneously with, or between successive plantings of, a main crop.

Succession planting has been touted as a way to minimize the risks of crop failure for small farmers. This includes the risk of adverse weather conditions, increased pest conditions and seed failure.

== See also ==
- Polyculture
- Nurse crop
- Three-field system
