= Herb spiral =

Garden bed design

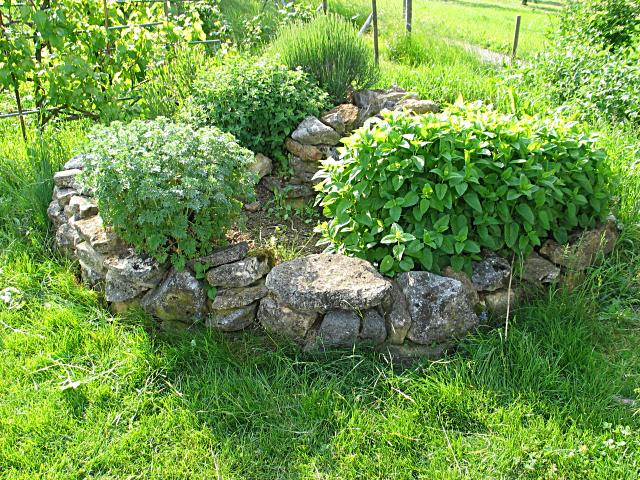
Herb Spiral in early summer

An herb spiral is a three dimensional garden bed for the cultivation of culinary herbs. The herb spiral is an example of permaculture design. It enables a variety of plants with different needs to grow in a small space and makes it possible to cater to the smallest space habitat requirements of plants of different climatic zones.

The herb spiral was invented by Bill Mollison. In his 1988 book Permaculture: A Designers‘ Manual, he discussed the omnipresence of spiral shapes in nature and early cultures.

== Structure ==
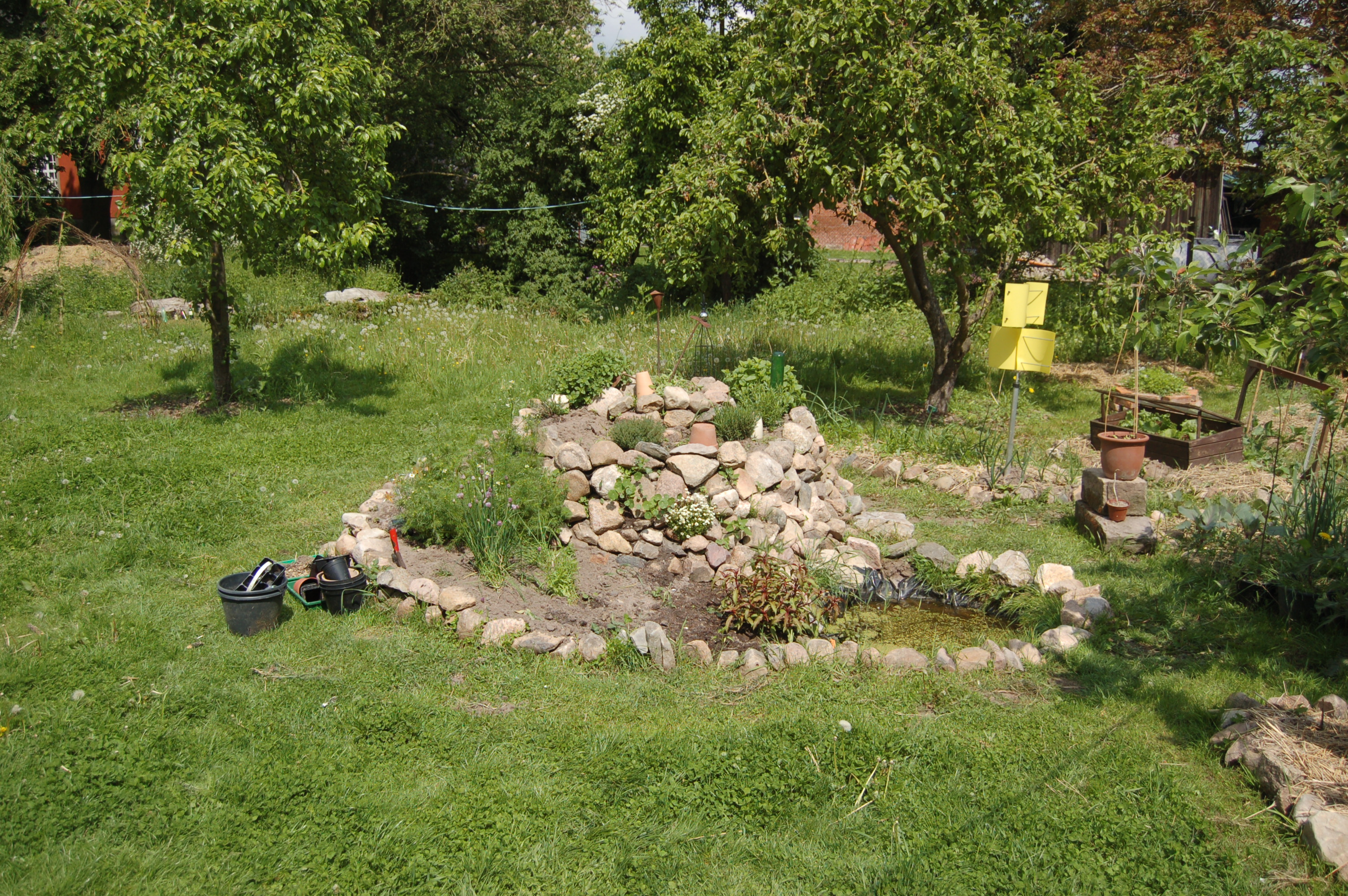
Herb Spiral

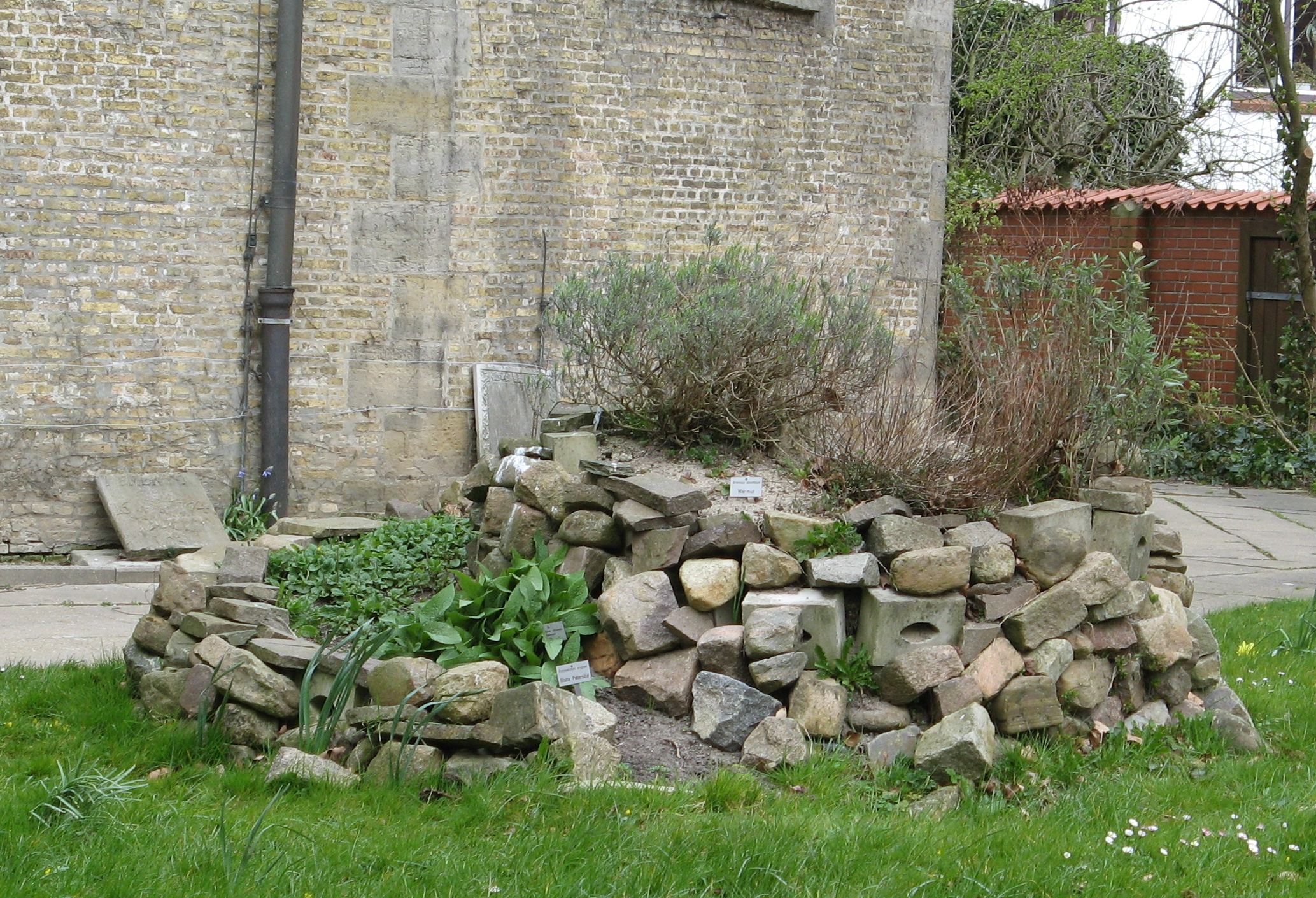
Side view of a Herb Spiral

Building plan

The spiral winds around a cairn and rises continuously. The padded bottom is increasingly mixed upwards with sand to make it permeable.

Seen from below, the herb spiral begins with a small pond on the south side. This creates a moist microclimate and also reflects light and heat against the south wall to the roots of the heat-loving herbs.

The middle part is called the normal zone. The soil here corresponds to typical North American growth conditions but is also still humid, though more permeable than in the humid zone. There are also areas that are in partial shade.

The upper part of the spiral forms a dry zone. The soil is permeable and lean. The internal structure of the herb spiral ensures good drainage. These are ideal conditions for a number of culinary herbs of the Mediterranean region.

The transition between these zones is fluent, so that a wide range is covered by growth conditions.

== Plants ==
Example planting schedule from Bill Mollison (from top to bottom):

- Rosemary
- Oregano
- Sage
- Tarragon
- Thyme
- Chives
- Chamomile
- Violet
- Parsley
- Marigold
- Mint
- Watercress

== See also ==
- Raised-bed gardening
- Garden
- Permaculture
