= Multiple cropping =

Agricultural cropping system

In agriculture, multiple cropping or multicropping is the practice of growing two or more crops in the same piece of land during one year, instead of just one crop. When multiple crops are grown simultaneously, this is also known as intercropping. This cropping system helps farmers to double their crop productivity and their income. But, the selection of two or more crops for practicing multicropping mainly depends on the mutual benefit of the selected crops.

Threshing can be difficult in multiple cropping systems where crops are harvested together. It can take the form of double-cropping, in which a second crop is planted after the first has been harvested. In the Garhwal Himalaya of India, a practice called barahnaja involves sowing 12 or more crops on the same plot, including various types of beans, grains, and millets, and harvesting them at different times.

== Benefits of multiple cropping ==
Adopting the practice of multiple cropping on a large scale can help in reducing the food crisis of a nation. Overall costs of input decreases, cost spent on fertilizers, irrigation, labour, etc. reduces because of growing two or more than two crops on the same field. Risk of weed growth, pest and disease infestation reduces because of mutual relationship within the crop. This results in better farm management and increased income of the farmer. However, only 5% of global rainfed cropland is under multiple cropping, while 40% of global irrigated cropland is under multiple cropping.

In China, the land reform movement and collectivization of farming facilitated double-cropping in the south of the country, leading to a major increase in agricultural yields.

The Soils, Food and Healthy Communities (SFHC) group experiments with ways to respond to climate change in Malawi. The group tries new recipes and new crops. They have experimented with multi-cropping in villages around Ekwendeni.

== See also ==
- Forest gardening
- Intercropping
- Nurse crop
- Succession planting
