= Catch crop =

Crop grown between plantings of a main crop

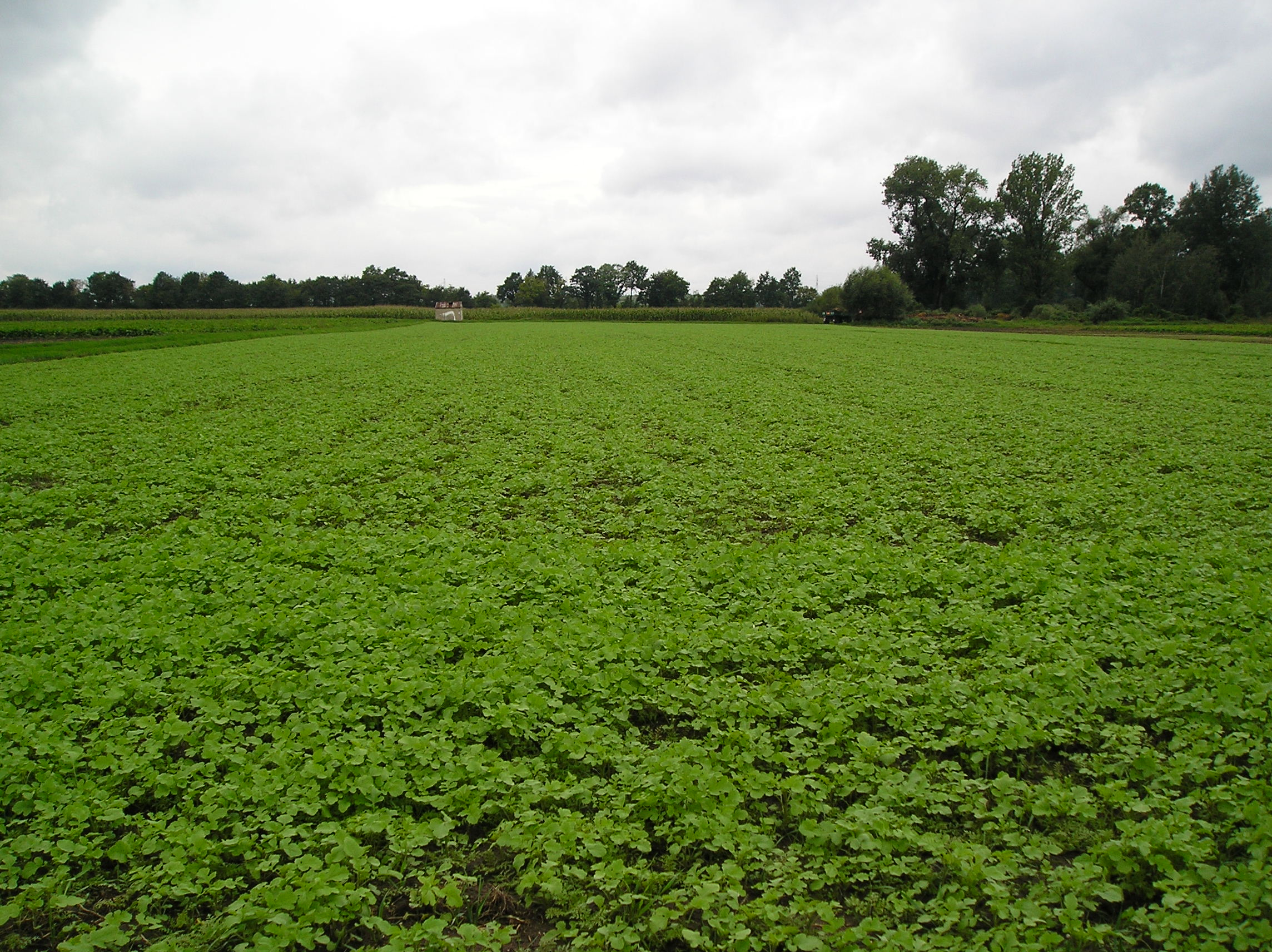
White mustard grown as catch crop in Poland

In agriculture, a catch crop is a fast-growing crop that is grown between successive plantings of a main crop. It is a specific type of cover crop that is grown between two main crops. This crop is utilized as a way to reduce nitrogen leaching but it also promotes environmental benefits such as fortifying soil structure, retention of water and enhancement of soil biological activity. Catch crops revolve around plant species that have short growing seasons, rapid growth, low soil and nutrients requirements to be considered a catch crop.

Catch cropping is a type of succession planting. It makes more efficient use of growing space. For example, radishes that mature from seed in 25–30 days can be grown between rows of most vegetables, and harvested long before the main crop matures. Or, a catch crop can be planted between the spring harvest and fall planting of some crops.

== Leach reduction ==
Growing catch crops is to improve and help maintain soil organic matter. This is achieved by promoting an increase of activity of soil microbes. Cultivation of this type of crop helps retain nutrients, specifically nitrogen and phosphorus from leaching from the soil. To be able to get these benefits in a field there are multiple factors that have to be taken into account to obtain the most out of the catch crops. Those factors include harvesting date, soil tillage, and sow timing being the most crucial. When timing of sowing is postponed from the date that was recommended a decrease of catch crop efficiency, growth and over performance occurs where studies have shown a decrease uptake of N.

== Soil-water management ==
Catch crops help protect soil against water erosion through its residue which increases soil roughness. The residue serves as a soil surface protection from splash effects as well contributes to lowering the surface runoff. Certain catch crop species are also able to create biopores by decaying roots which create flow paths in the soil causing an increase of water infiltration. Although during the crop growth they come to deplete soil water some species of catch crops help preserve water once they are killed.
