= Convertible husbandry =

Historic system of farming alternating land between arable land and pasture

Convertible husbandry, also known as alternate husbandry or up-and-down husbandry, is a method of farming whereby strips of arable farmland were temporarily converted into grass pasture, known as leys. These remained under grass for up to 10 years before being ploughed under again, while some eventually became permanent pasturage. It was a process used during the 16th century through the 19th century by "which a higher proportion of land was used to support increasing numbers of livestock in many parts of England." Its adoption was an important component of the British Agricultural Revolution.

Ley farming, a similar system of growing fodder on fallow plots of arable land, remains in use today.

== Description ==
Convertible husbandry was a process that consisted of keeping arable land fallow for long periods as pasture for livestock. This system utilized fertilizer in the form of animal manure. Fertilizer was used in greater quantities due to the increase in animal husbandry and resulted in benefiting crop yields when it was time for tillage. Farmers sowed specific grass seeds to control the quality of their pasture.

== Historical context ==
Before the 16th and 17th centuries, most farmlands in Britain used simple alternations of tilling and fallowing during different seasons over several years, while livestock was often kept on less productive land and commons. However, in the Midlands the rising population, density of settlements, lack of new areas into which cultivation could expand, and the 15th century enclosures of sheep flocks, led to a system of agriculture with increasing numbers of livestock. A possible factor that influenced the adoption of convertible husbandry was the changing skill levels of workers. In the words of historian Eric Kerridge, the combination of "floating of water-meadows, the substitution of up-and-down husbandry for permanent tillage and permanent grass or for shifting cultivation, the introduction of new fallow crops and selected grasses, marsh drainage, manuring, and stock breeding" were essential innovations of the British Agricultural Revolution.

Although often praised as increasing yields and efficiency, this is debatable. Yields were often poor in the late Middle Ages and approximately equivalent to regular common fields. It was not always adaptable to the type of land or soil at all locations. Kitsikopoulos argues it was the introduction of fodder legumes, such as clover, in the early modern period which eventually truly achieved greater agricultural productivity.

Although debatable, many agricultural historians also believe that the introduction of convertible husbandry was brought about with the introduction of the turnip. They argue that "the lowly turnip made possible a change in crop rotation which did not require much capital, but which brought about a tremendous rise in agricultural productivity." They believe that this "fodder" crop pushed agriculture in a direction in which "alternating" husbandry was seen as more efficient than traditional permanent pasture farming and jump-started the improvement of crop rotation and agricultural output versus capital. Although the turnip was popularized by Lord Townshend during the mid-18th century, the use of turnips being grown as fodder was seen as early as the 16th century.

== Praise ==
Convertible husbandry has been praised as the "best way to keep high fertility on both arable and pasture and to retain excellent soil texture and composition." According to one author, the rotation it provided between pasture and arable land "not only produced the same amount of grain on a much reduced area, but broke the agrarian cycle of diminished returns by allowing more sheep and cattle to be kept, animals whose dung maintained" fertility.

== See also ==
- Intensive farming
