= Nurse crop =

Annual crop used in establishment of a perennial crop

Nurse crops are a subtype of nurse plants, facilitating the growth of other species of plants. The term is used primarily in agriculture, but also in forestry. Cover crops are a type of nurse crop.

== Agriculture ==
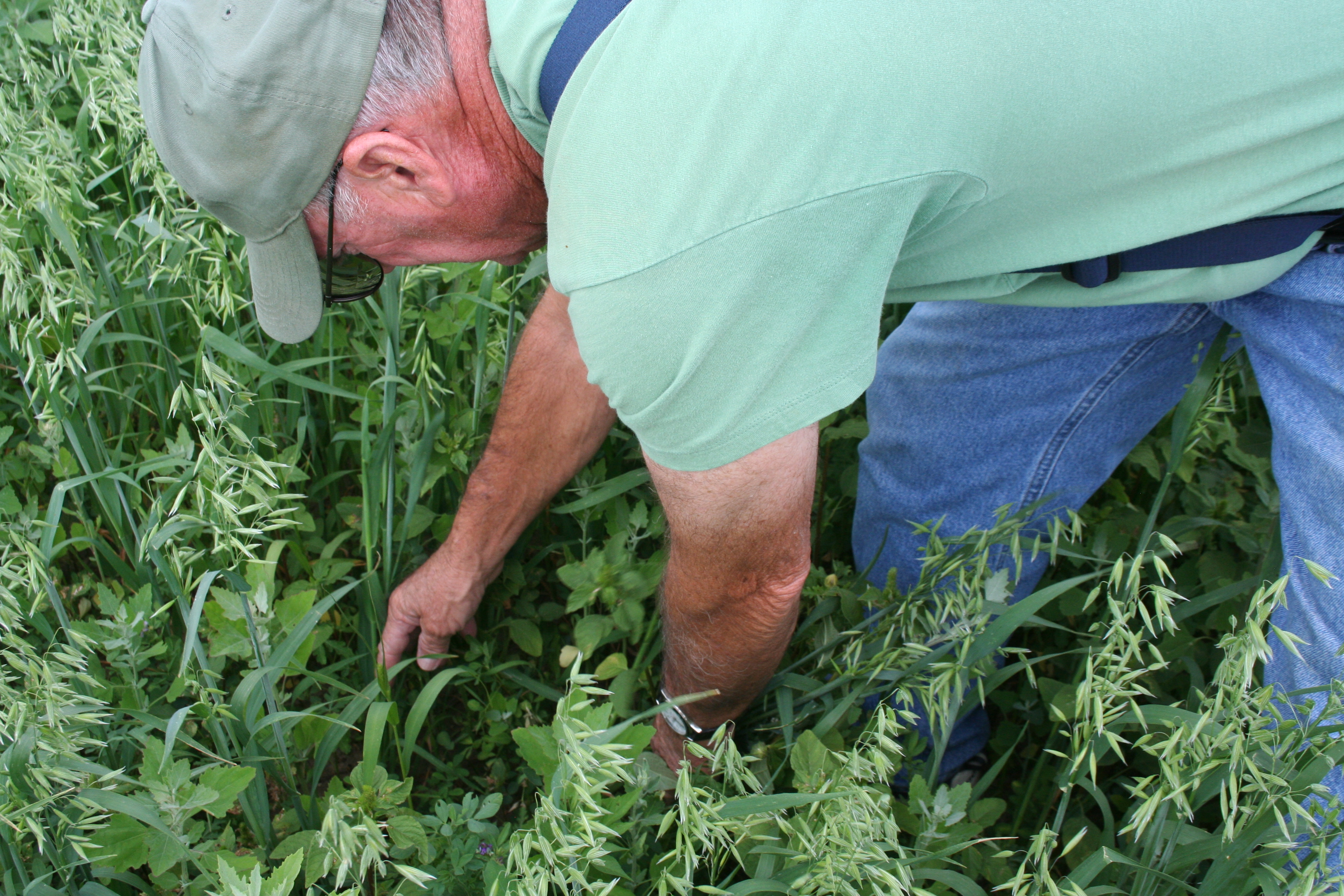
Oats as nurse crop for alfalfa

In agriculture, a nurse crop is an annual crop used to assist in establishment of a perennial crop. The widest use of nurse crops is in the establishment of legumaceous plants such as alfalfa, clover, and trefoil. Occasionally, nurse crops are used for establishment of perennial grasses.

Nurse crops reduce the incidence of weeds, prevent erosion, and prevent excessive sunlight from reaching tender seedlings. Often, the nurse crop can be harvested for grain, straw, hay, or pasture. Oats are the most common nurse crop, though other annual grains are also used. Nurse cropping of tall or dense-canopied plants can protect more vulnerable species through shading or by providing a wind break.

However, if ill-maintained, nurse crops can block sunlight from reaching seedlings.

Trap crops prevent pests from affecting the desired plant.

== Forestry ==
In forestry, 'nurse crop' can be applied to trees or shrubs that help the development of other species of trees. Wind breaking, frost protection, thermal insulation, and shade can all be provided by nurse crops in forests. Aspens especially provide partial shade, allowing understory growth.

== See also ==
- Companion planting
- Multiple cropping
