= Fallow =

Agricultural practice

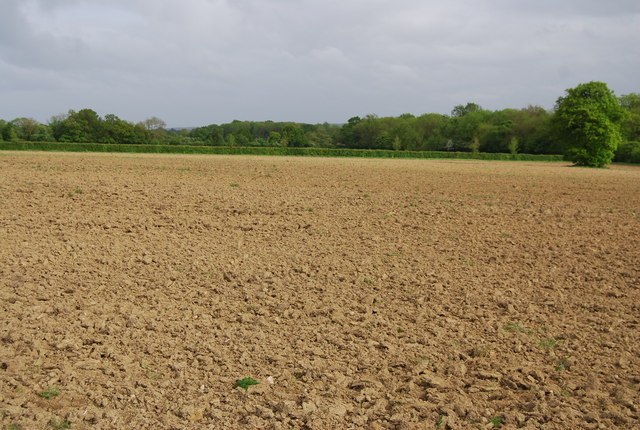
A ploughed field left unsown

Fallow is a farming technique in which arable land is left without sowing for one or more vegetative cycles. The goal of fallowing is to allow the land to recover and store organic matter while retaining moisture and disrupting pest life cycles and soil-borne pathogens by temporarily removing their hosts. Crop rotation systems typically called for some of a farmer's fields to be left fallow each year.

The increase in intensive farming, including the use of cover crops in lieu of fallow practices, has caused a loss of acreage of fallow land, as well as field margins, hedges, and wasteland. This has reduced biodiversity; fallows have been the primary habitat for farmland bird populations.

== Fallow syndrome ==
Fallow syndrome is when a crop has insufficient nutrient uptake due to the lack of arbuscular mycorhizae (AM fungi) in the soil following a fallow period. Crops such as corn that are prone to fallow syndrome should not follow a period of fallow, but instead should follow a cover crop which is a host for AM fungi, such as oats or other small grain crops. The presence of any plant roots, including weeds, can reduce occurrence of fallow syndrome. Nowadays, agricultural fields are routinely planted with cover crops to prevent erosion, keep down weeds, provide a green manure, and reduce the risk of fallow syndrome.

== Cultural practices ==
The Book of Leviticus includes a mandate that fields are to be left fallow every seventh year. Furthermore, every fiftieth year is a Jubilee year where fields are also to be left fallow. Since no new crops would be available for two years, and only the summer fruits would be available for the following year, this creates a much greater risk of starvation overall. However, modern scholars contend that the jubilee year was held on the 49th year, meaning fields were only fallow for one year.

== See also ==
- Dryland farming
- Crop rotation
- Three-field system
- No-till farming
- Shifting cultivation
- Shmita
