= Three-field system =

Medieval crop rotation system

The three-field system is a regime of crop rotation in which a field is planted with one set of crops one year, a different set in the second year, and left fallow in the third year. A set of crops is rotated from one field to another. The technique was first used in China in the Eastern Zhou period and arose independently in Europe in the medieval period.

Three-field system with ridge and furrow fields (furlongs)

The three-field system lets farmers plant more crops and therefore increase production. Under this system, the arable land of an estate or village was divided into three large fields: one was planted in the autumn with winter wheat or rye; the second field was planted with crops such as peas, lentils, or beans; and the third was left fallow (unplanted). Cereal crops deplete the ground of nitrogen, but legumes can fix nitrogen and so fertilize the soil. The fallow fields would overgrow with weeds which were used for grazing farm animals. Their excrement fertilized that field's soil to regain its nutrients. Crop assignments were rotated every year, so each field segment would be planted for two out of every three years.

Previously a two-field system had been in place, with half the land being left fallow. In Europe, the change to a three-field system happened from the 9th century to the 11th century. With more crops available to sell and agriculture dominating the economy at the time, the three-field system created a significant surplus and increased economic prosperity.

The three-field system needed more plowing of land, and its introduction coincided with the adoption of the moldboard plow. These parallel developments complemented each other and increased agricultural productivity. The legume crop needed summer rain to succeed, and so the three-field system was less successful around the Mediterranean. Oats for horse food could also be planted in the spring, which, combined with the adoption of horse collars and horseshoes, led to the replacement of oxen by horses for many farming tasks, with an associated increase in agricultural productivity and the nutrition available to the population.

In his 1769 work Lehre vom Gyps als vorzueglich guten Dung zu allen Erd-Gewaechsen auf Aeckern und Wiesen, Hopfen- und Weinbergen, Johann Friedrich Mayer was one of the first Germans to advocate for new ways of expanding beyond the medieval three-field system.

== See also ==
- Succession planting

== Bibliography ==
- Needham, Joseph (1984), Science and Civilization in China 6-2
