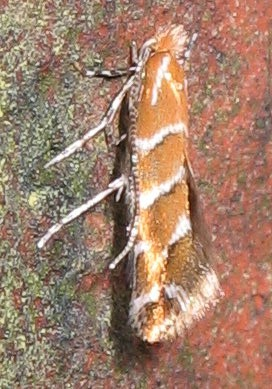

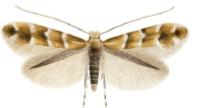

Scientific classification
- Kingdom: Animalia
- Phylum: Arthropoda
- Clade: Pancrustacea
- Class: Insecta
- Order: Lepidoptera
- Family: Gracillariidae
- Genus: Cameraria
- Species: C. ohridella

Binomial name
- Cameraria ohridella Deschka & Dimić, 1986

= Horse-chestnut leaf miner =

Species of moth

The horse-chestnut leaf miner (Cameraria ohridella) is a leaf-mining moth of the family Gracillariidae. The horse-chestnut leaf miner was first observed in North Macedonia in 1984, and was described as a new species in 1986. Its larvae are leaf miners on the common horse-chestnut (Aesculus hippocastanum). The horse-chestnut leafminer was first collected and inadvertently pressed in herbarium sheets by the botanist Theodor von Heldreich in central Greece in 1879.

== Damage ==
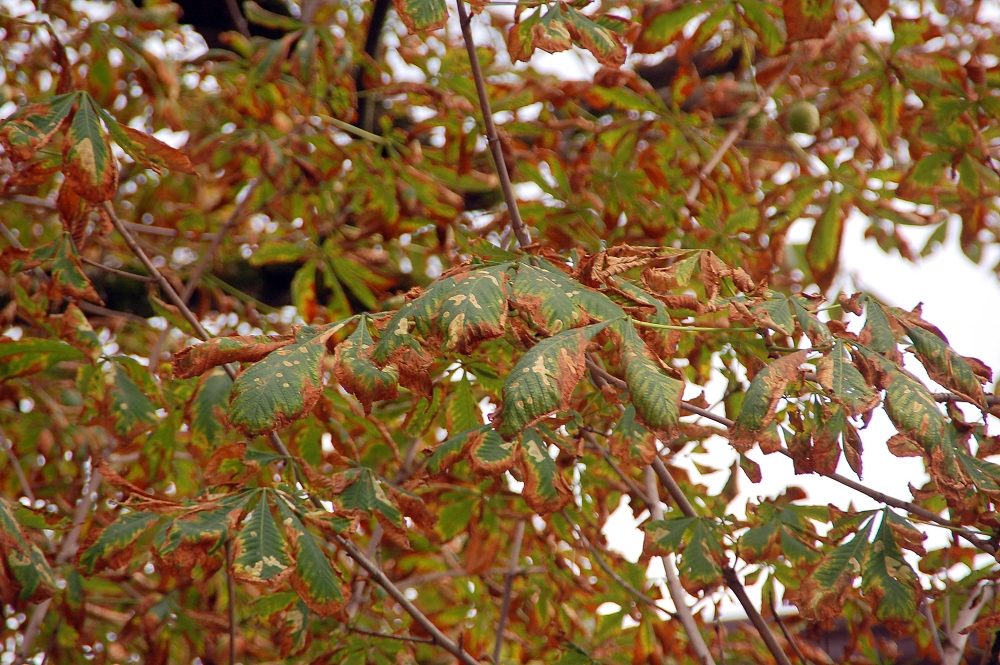
Leaf miner damage

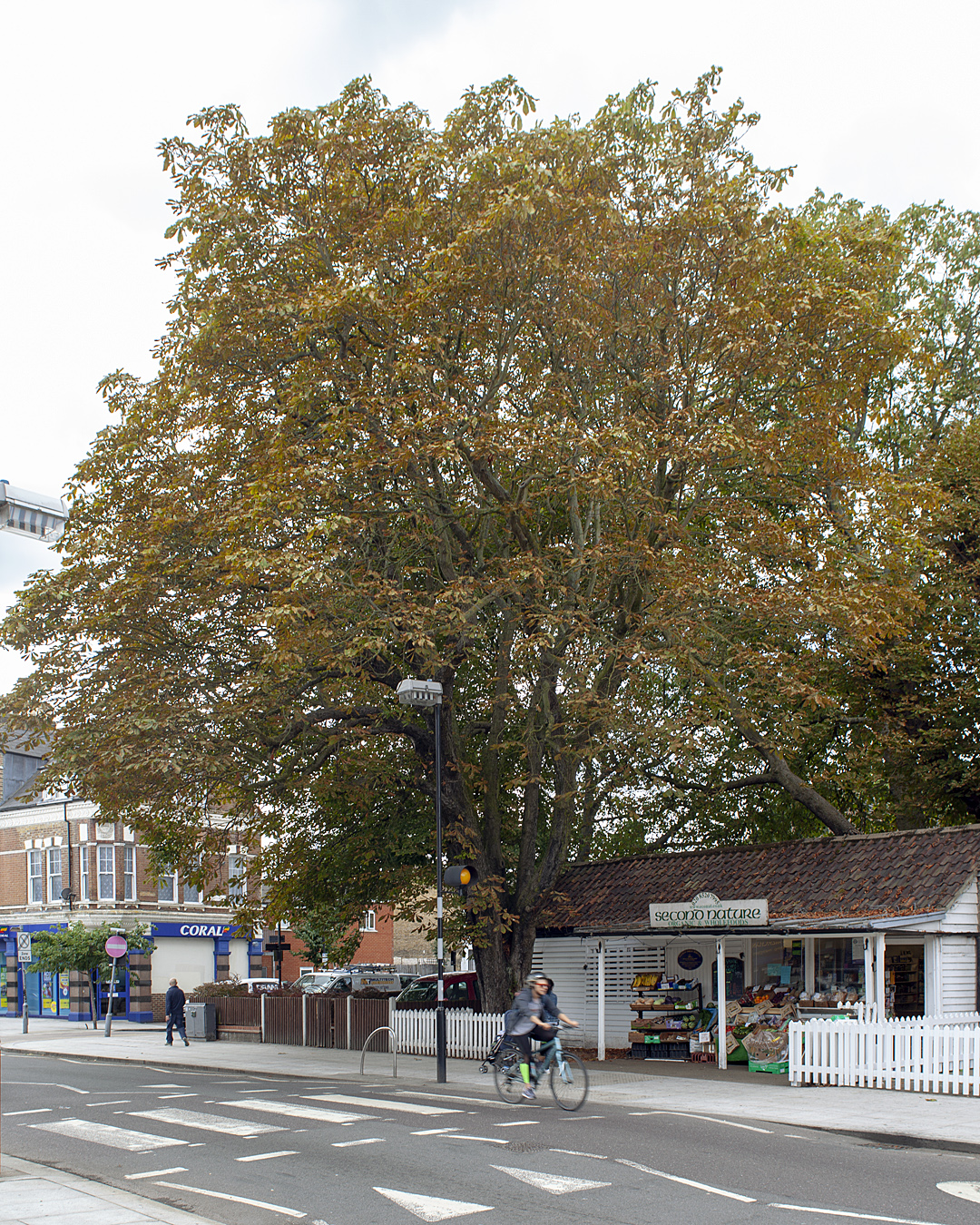
Leaf miner damage throughout the canopy

Cameraria ohridella causes significant damage, mainly late summer browning, to the appearance of horse-chestnut trees. Despite the poor appearance of these infested trees, there is no evidence that damage by the moth leads to tree death. Seed weight, photosynthetic storage and reproductive capacity may however be reduced. Trees survive repeated infestations and re-flush normally in the following year. It appears that most of the damage caused by the moth occurs too late in the growing season to greatly affect tree performance. Consequently, there is no reason to fell and remove trees just because they are attacked by C. ohridella.

The larva feeds in a mine in the leaves of the tree, damaging the leaves and stunting growth. Infected leaves are covered in small brown patches which spread rapidly across the entire tree, giving an autumnal appearance. Eventually the leaves die and drop off; when new ones grow they are again infected. This cycle can repeat itself several times in one season.

== Description ==
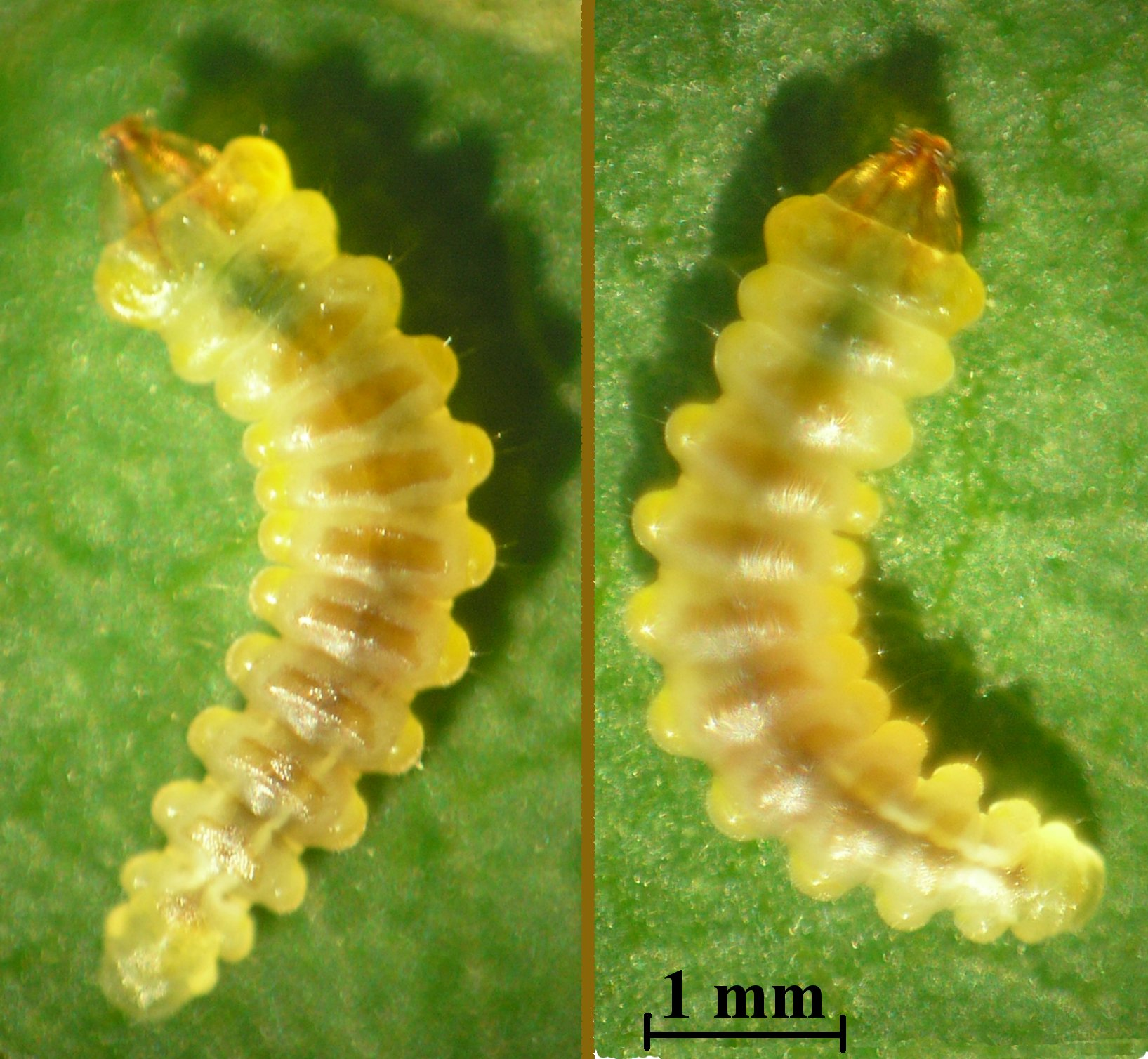
Caterpillar

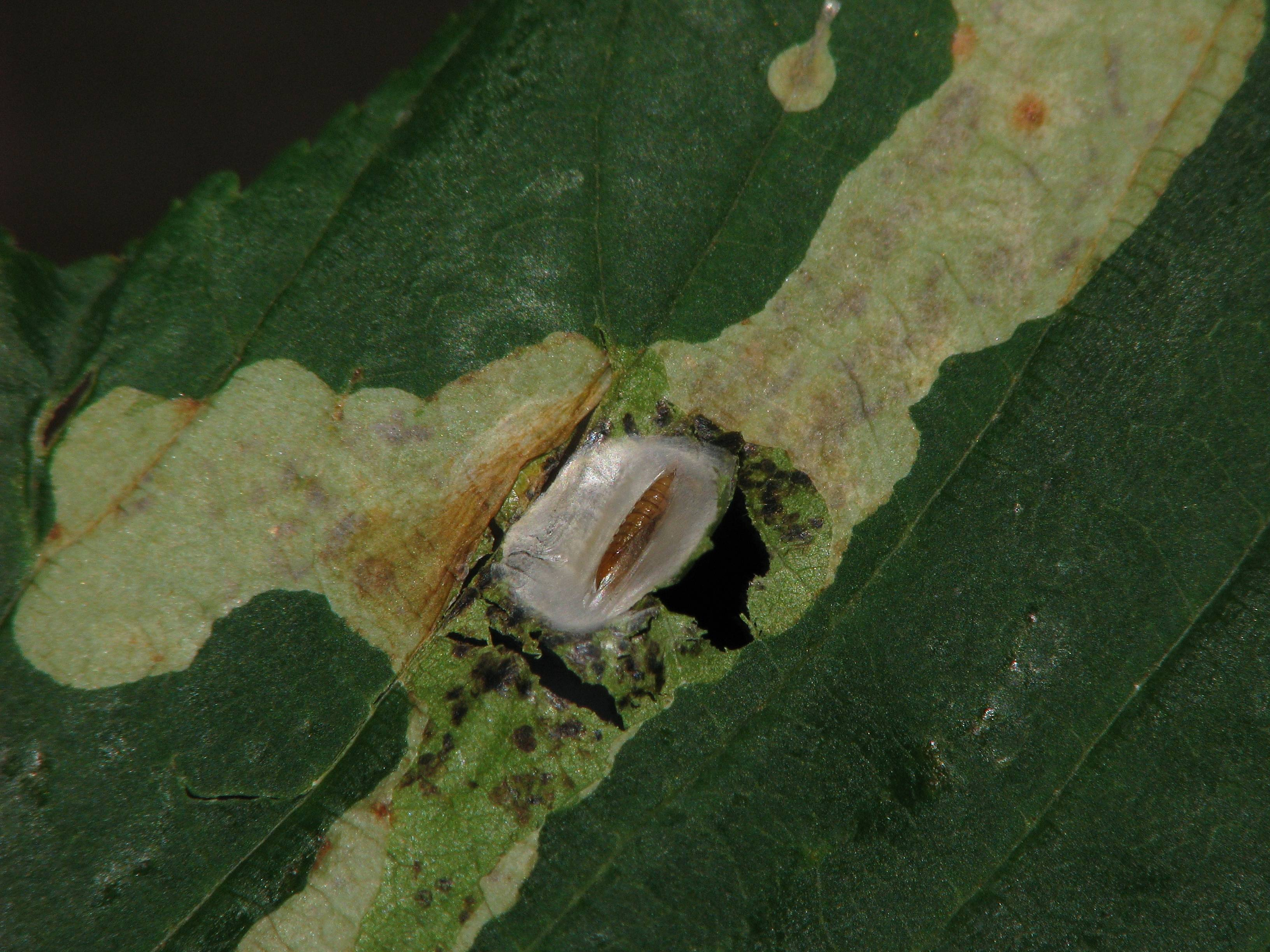
Pupa

The moth is up to 5 millimetres (3/16 inch) long, with shiny, bright brown forewings with thin, silvery white stripes. The hindwings are dark grey with long fringes. Each female moth lays between 20 and 40 eggs singly on the upper surface of leaves, and once these hatch 2–3 weeks later, the larvae develop through five feeding phases (or instars) and two prepupal (spinning) phases before the pupal phase. The first stage creates a small cavity (or mine) parallel to a vein in the leaf and is "sap-sipping" rather than "tissue-feeding". By the third instar, the larva creates a mine approximately 8mm in diameter; this is further expanded by later instars until one mine can cover several square centimeters. The larva starts to pupate around four weeks after the egg hatches and, except when hibernating as a pupa in the mine, the adult emerges around two weeks later. In severe infestations, the mines of individuals can merge and almost the entire leaf area may be utilised. When this occurs it may lead to high moth mortality as the larvae compete for space and food. The moth is able to go through up to five generations each year, if the weather is hot and dry; on average in western Europe, the moth goes through three generations each year. The last generation of the year pupates for over six months so as to survive the winter. The pupae are extremely frost tolerant and have been recorded to survive temperatures as low as −23 °C (−9 °F). This allows its populations to increase even after hard winters.

The dead patches that the horse-chestnut leaf miner causes on leaves are similar to damage caused to horse-chestnut trees by the fungus Guignardia aesculi, but can be distinguished by the fungal infection often being outlined by a conspicuous yellow band which the mines lack. The pupae can be mistaken for pupae of the genus Phyllonorycter but can be distinguished because C. ohridella pupae do not have a cremaster and the first five abdominal sections have strong lateral spines on them.

== Distribution and dispersal ==
Distribution map (1984-2007)

Cameraria ohridella has now been found in Albania, Austria, Belgium, Belarus, Bosnia and Herzegovina, Bulgaria, Croatia, the Czech Republic, Denmark, England and Wales, Estonia, Finland, France, Germany, Greece, Hungary, Ireland, Italy, Kosovo, Latvia, Liechtenstein, Lithuania, Luxembourg, Moldova, Montenegro, the Netherlands, North Macedonia, Poland, Serbia, Romania, Russia, Serbia, Slovakia, Slovenia, Spain, Sweden, Switzerland, Turkey and Ukraine. Although horse-chestnut occurs naturally mostly above the 700–1,000 m (2,300–3,300 ft) contours the moth does well in well-watered places such as parks in cities and at low elevation but not well in the hotter parts of Europe e.g. Spain. Probably aided greatly by vehicular transport, the moth has attained a very rapid dispersal rate across Europe of 60 kilometres (40 miles) per year.

== Origin and epidemiology ==
Cameraria ohridella was first noticed from outbreaks near Ohrid Lake, Yugoslavia in 1984, and was described as a new species by Deschka and Dimić in 1986. A likely Balkan origin for this moth was evidenced from a decrease in genetic diversity from natural towards artificial horse-chestnut stands that were planted around Europe since around 1600. This Balkan origin is further documented by numerous herbarium samples that date back to 1879. These include an outbreak which occurred in horse-chestnut specimens collected by F.K. Meyer in 1961 in Albania. Of the 30 known mitochondrial haplotypes for the species only three (known as A, B and C) have invaded the rest of Europe since 1989, and only A is dominant. It is likely that the frequency of haplotype A has been increasing even in Balkan natural sites, aided by the late development of roads in the region.

== Host plants ==
As well as colonising the leaves of the common horse-chestnut, C. ohridella is also able to feed on Aesculus pavia, Acer platanoides and Acer pseudoplatanus, on which in particular one mitochondrial race, haplotype B, seems to develop successfully when nearby horse-chestnut leaves are exhausted, but is not thought to pose such a strong risk to these species unlike to the common horse-chestnut.

== Control ==
=== Parasitoids ===
Over 60 generalist parasitoids have been recorded. However, for biological control a highly specialist parasitoid still needs to be found.

=== Predators ===
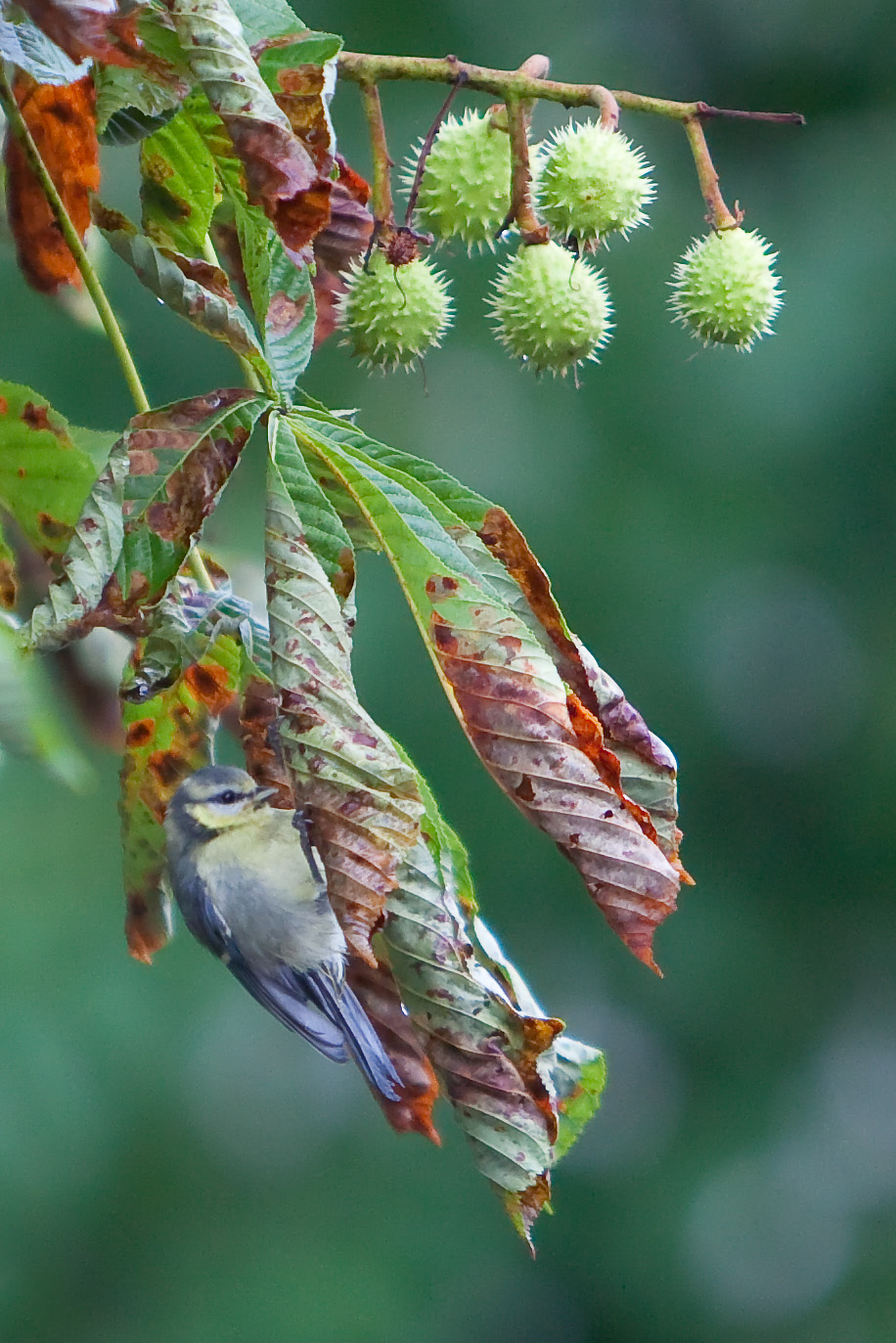
A juvenile blue tit feeding on C. ohridella

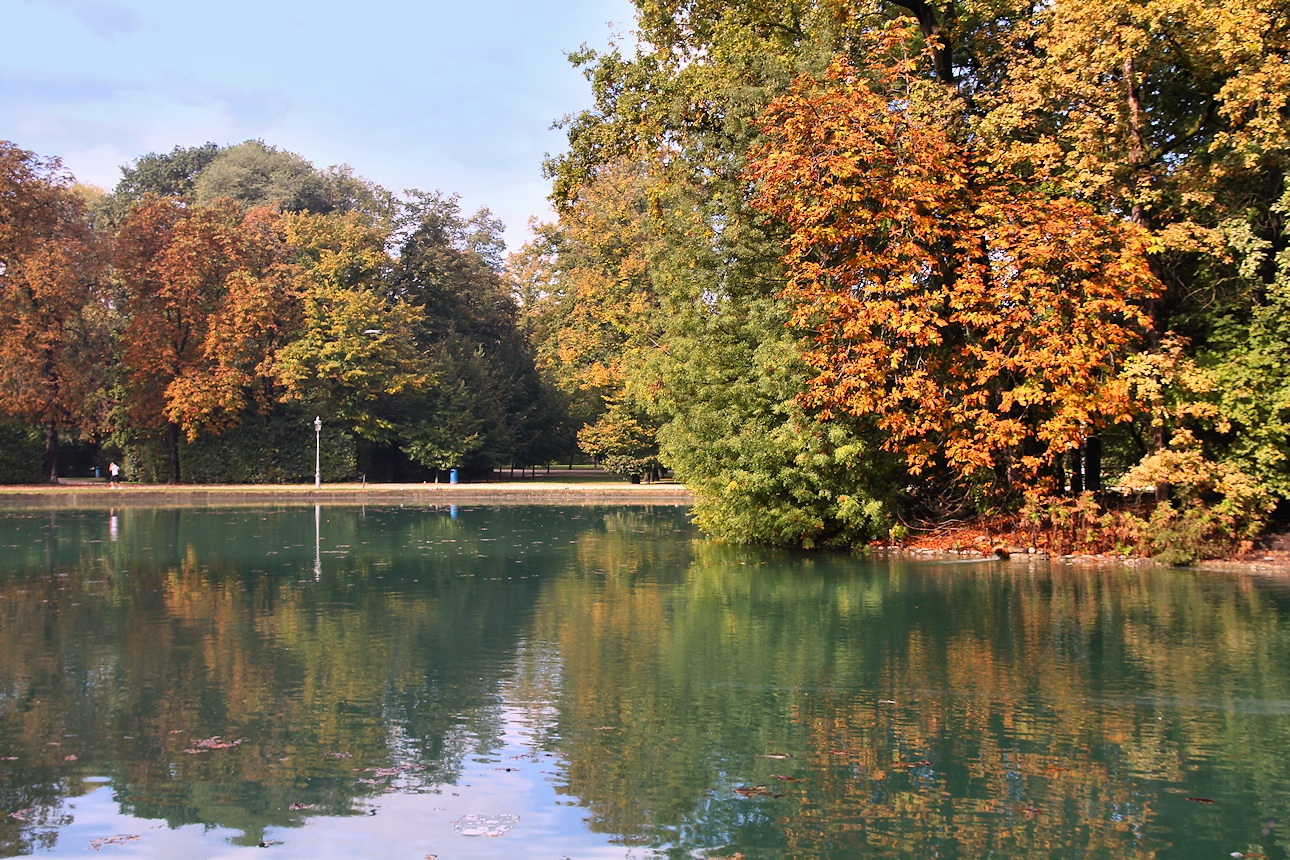
Horse-chestnut leaf miner tree damage in Parma, Italy

A number of natural predators of the larval stages of C. ohridella have been recorded. Observations have shown that blue tits (Cyanistes caeruleus), great tits (Parus major) and marsh tits (Poecile palustris) feed on the larvae. Between them, three tit species are thought to prey on between 2 and 4% of the larvae. The southern oak bushcricket (Meconema meridionale) has also been found to prey on C. ohridella, consuming around 10 larvae per day. Overall the predation by the southern oak bushcricket is insignificant compared to that by birds however. Experiments with the predatory mite Euseius finlandicus, bush crickets (Phaneroptera sp.), ladybirds and lacewings found that none prey on C. ohridella.

=== Procedures ===
Inadvisably, trees can be removed, or better, leaves cleared and burned before adult emergence by the end of March. Use of the systemic insecticide imidacloprid is usually banned as it kills bees. Fenoxycarb causes up to 100% pupal mortality, has low environmental toxicity and can be combined successfully with manual leaf removal. A synthetic pheromone can be used to trap males, but effective control may be hard to thus achieve. In any case, infestation levels could diminish over time as Cameraria ohridella starts to recruit generalist members of the local parasitoid wasp community.

=== Projects ===
A number of projects have been launched to investigate the biology and biological control of Cameraria ohridella and its impact since 2001, for example, an EU-wide multidisciplinary project, CONTROCAM ("Control of Cameraria") and the HAM-CAM Project.
