= Cover crop =

Crop planted to manage erosion and soil quality

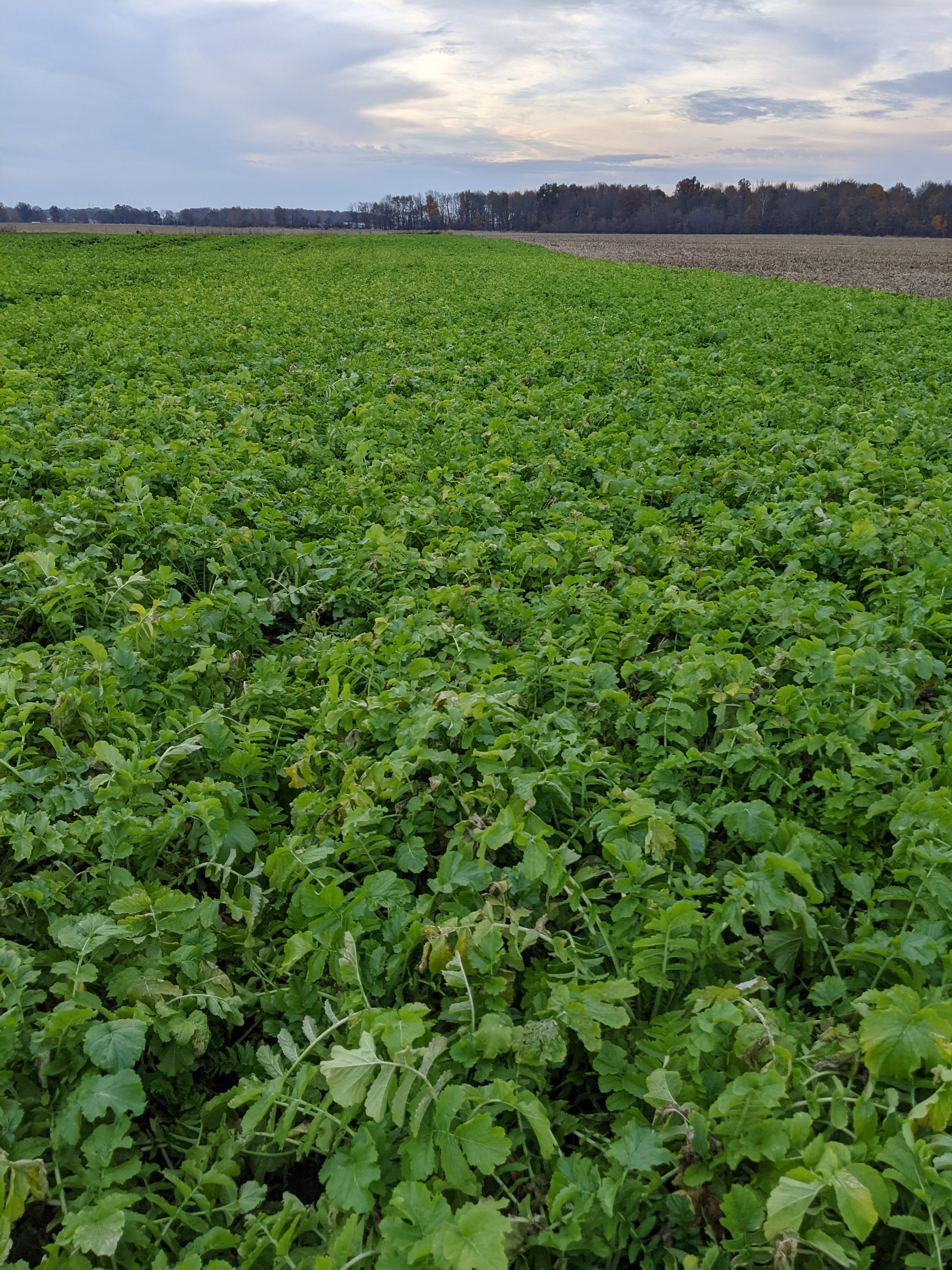
A cover crop of tillage radish in early November

In agriculture, cover crops are plants that are planted to cover the soil rather than for the purpose of being harvested. Cover crops manage soil erosion, soil fertility, soil quality, water, weeds, pests, diseases, biodiversity and wildlife in an agroecosystem—an ecological system managed and shaped by humans. Cover crops can increase microbial activity in the soil, which has a positive effect on nitrogen availability, nitrogen uptake in target crops, and crop yields. Cover crops reduce water pollution risks and remove CO_{2} from the atmosphere. Cover crops may be an off-season crop planted after harvesting the cash crop. Cover crops are nurse crops in that they increase the survival of the main crop being harvested, and are often grown over the winter.

== Soil erosion ==
Although cover crops can perform multiple functions in an agroecosystem simultaneously, they are often grown for the sole purpose of preventing soil erosion. Soil erosion is a process that can irreparably reduce the productive capacity of an agroecosystem. Cover crops reduce soil loss by improving soil structure and increasing infiltration, protecting the soil surface, scattering raindrop energy, and reducing the velocity of the movement of water over the soil surface. Dense cover crop stands physically slow down the velocity of rainfall before it contacts the soil surface, preventing soil splashing and erosive surface runoff. Additionally, vast cover crop root networks help anchor the soil in place and increase soil porosity, producing suitable habitat networks for soil macrofauna. It keeps the enrichment of the soil good for the next few years.

== Soil fertility management ==
One of the primary uses of cover crops is to increase soil fertility. These types of cover crops are referred to as "green manure". They are used to manage a range of soil macronutrients and micronutrients. Of the various nutrients, the impact that cover crops have on nitrogen management has received the most attention from researchers and farmers because nitrogen is often the most limiting nutrient in crop production.

Often, green manure crops are grown for a specific period, and then plowed under before reaching full maturity to improve soil fertility and quality. The stalks left block the soil from being eroded.

Green manure crops are commonly leguminous, meaning they are part of the pea family, Fabaceae. This family is unique in that all of the species in it set pods, such as bean, lentil, lupins and alfalfa. Leguminous cover crops are typically high in nitrogen and can often provide the required quantity of nitrogen for crop production. In conventional farming, this nitrogen is typically applied in chemical fertilizer form. In organic farming, nitrogen inputs may take the form of organic fertilizers, compost, cover crop seed, and fixation by legume cover crops. This quality of cover crops is called fertilizer replacement value.

Another quality unique to leguminous cover crops is that they form symbiotic relationships with the rhizobial bacteria that reside in legume root nodules. Lupins is nodulated by the soil microorganism Bradyrhizobium sp. (Lupinus). Bradyrhizobia are encountered as microsymbionts in other leguminous crops (Argyrolobium, Lotus, Ornithopus, Acacia, Lupinus) of Mediterranean origin. These bacteria convert biologically unavailable atmospheric nitrogen gas (N_{2}) to biologically available ammonium (NH^{+}_{4}) through the process of biological nitrogen fixation. In general, cover crops increase soil microbial activity, which has a positive effect on nitrogen availability in the soil, nitrogen uptake in target crops, and crop yields.

Prior to the advent of the Haber–Bosch process, an energy-intensive method developed to carry out industrial nitrogen fixation and create chemical nitrogen fertilizer, most nitrogen introduced to ecosystems arose through biological nitrogen fixation. Some scientists believe that widespread biological nitrogen fixation, achieved mainly through the use of cover crops, is the only alternative to industrial nitrogen fixation in the effort to maintain or increase future food production levels. Industrial nitrogen fixation has been criticized as an unsustainable source of nitrogen for food production due to its reliance on fossil fuel energy and the environmental impacts associated with chemical nitrogen fertilizer use in agriculture. Such widespread environmental impacts include nitrogen fertilizer losses into waterways, which can lead to eutrophication (nutrient loading) and ensuing hypoxia (oxygen depletion) of large bodies of water.

An example of this is in the Mississippi Valley Basin, where years of fertilizer nitrogen loading into the watershed from agricultural production have resulted in an annual summer hypoxic "dead zone" off the Gulf of Mexico that reached an area of over 22,000 square kilometres (8,500 sq mi) in 2017. The ecological complexity of marine life in this zone has been diminishing as a consequence.

As well as bringing nitrogen into agroecosystems through biological nitrogen fixation, types of cover crops known as "catch crops" are used to retain and recycle soil nitrogen already present. The catch crops take up surplus nitrogen remaining from fertilization of the previous crop, preventing it from being lost through leaching, or gaseous denitrification or volatilization.

Catch crops are typically fast-growing annual cereal species adapted to scavenge available nitrogen efficiently from the soil. The nitrogen fixed in catch crop biomass is released back into the soil once the cash crop is incorporated as a green manure or otherwise begins to decompose.

An example of green manure use comes from Nigeria, where the cover crop Mucuna pruriens (velvet bean) has been found to increase the availability of phosphorus in soil after a farmer applies rock phosphate.

== Soil quality management ==
Cover crops can also improve soil quality by increasing soil organic matter levels through the input of cover crop biomass over time. Increased soil organic matter enhances soil structure as well as the water and nutrient holding and buffering capacities of the soil. It can also lead to increased soil carbon sequestration, which has been promoted as a strategy to help offset the rise in atmospheric carbon dioxide levels.

Soil quality is managed to produce optimum conditions for crops to flourish. The principal factors affecting soil quality are soil salination, pH, microorganism balance, and the prevention of soil contamination. It is noted that if soil quality is properly managed and maintained, it forms the foundation for a healthy and productive environment. One can design and manage a crop that will produce a healthy environment for quite some time.

=== Soil health and ecosystem services ===
Recent syntheses indicate that cover cropping generally improves several indicators of soil physical and chemical quality, although the magnitude of change depends on species selection, climate, soil texture and the duration of cover crop use. A global meta-analysis of 102 field studies reported that cover crops increased saturated hydraulic conductivity by about 106%, and raised total organic carbon and total nitrogen in the topsoil by approximately 10% and 20%, respectively, relative to systems without cover crops.

Cover crops also tend to increase soil organic carbon and nitrogen in biologically active pools such as microbial biomass and particulate organic matter, which support nutrient cycling and aggregate formation. The same meta-analysis found average increases of roughly 20% in microbial biomass carbon and close to 50% in particulate organic carbon under cover crops compared with bare or fallow treatments. Long-term field experiments further suggest that diverse cover crop mixtures can produce lasting improvements in soil structure that carry over to subsequent cash crops by enhancing the stability and size distribution of soil aggregates.

Beyond soil structure, cover crops contribute to multiple ecosystem services, including reduced surface runoff and sediment loss, lower nitrate leaching, enhanced soil biodiversity and suppression of weeds and some pests. At the same time, meta-analyses highlight important trade-offs and context dependence: in some environments, cover crops may reduce soil water availability to the following cash crop or have neutral or variable effects on yields, particularly in semi-arid regions or when termination is poorly timed, and long-term impacts on productivity and profitability are still uncertain in several climatic zones due to limited multi-decadal studies.

== Water management ==
By reducing soil erosion, cover crops often also reduce both the rate and quantity of water that drains off the field, which would normally pose environmental risks to waterways and ecosystems downstream. Cover crop biomass acts as a physical barrier between rainfall and the soil surface, allowing raindrops to steadily trickle down through the soil profile. Also, as stated above, cover crop root growth results in the formation of soil pores, which, in addition to enhancing soil macrofauna habitat provides pathways for water to filter through the soil profile rather than draining off the field as surface flow. With increased water infiltration, the potential for soil water storage and the recharge of aquifers can be improved.

Just before cover crops are killed (by such practices including mowing, tilling, discing, rolling, or herbicide application) they contain a large amount of moisture. When the cover crop is incorporated into the soil, or left on the soil surface, it often increases soil moisture. In agroecosystems where water for crop production is in short supply, cover crops can be used as a mulch to conserve water by shading and cooling the soil surface. This reduces the evaporation of soil moisture and helps preserve soil nutrients.

== Weed management ==
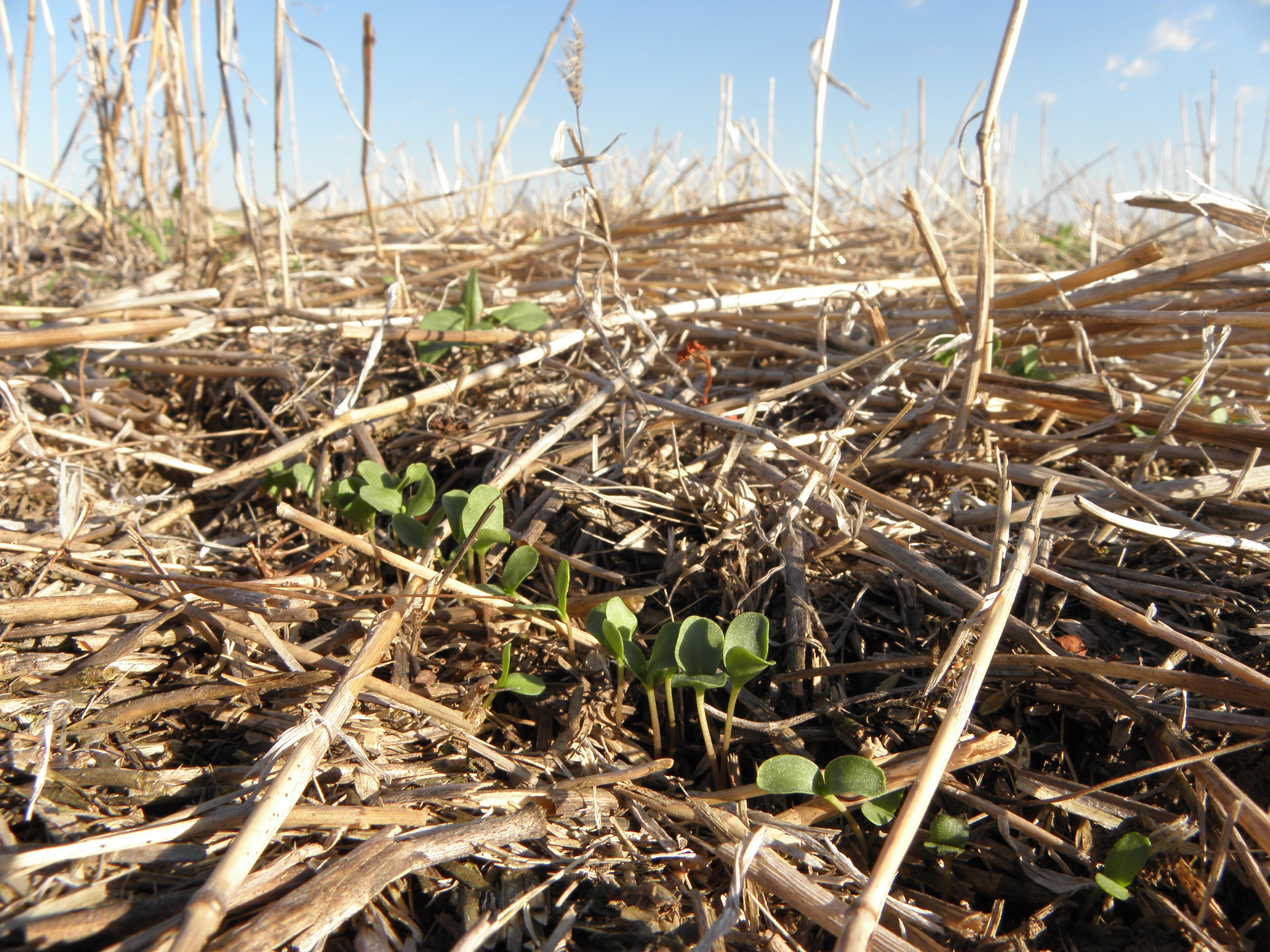
Cover crop in South Dakota

Thick cover crop stands often compete well with weeds during the cover crop growth period, and can prevent most germinated weed seeds from completing their life cycle and reproducing. If the cover crop is flattened down on the soil surface rather than incorporated into the soil as a green manure after its growth is terminated, it can form a nearly impenetrable mat. This drastically reduces light transmittance to weed seeds, which in many cases reduces weed seed germination rates. Furthermore, even when weed seeds germinate, they often run out of stored energy for growth before building the necessary structural capacity to break through the cover crop mulch layer. This is often termed the cover crop smother effect.

Some cover crops suppress weeds both during growth and after death. During growth these cover crops compete vigorously with weeds for available space, light, and nutrients, and after death they smother the next flush of weeds by forming a mulch layer on the soil surface. For example, researchers found that when using Melilotus officinalis (yellow sweetclover) as a cover crop in an improved fallow system (where a fallow period is intentionally improved by any number of different management practices, including the planting of cover crops), weed biomass only constituted between 1–12% of total standing biomass at the end of the cover crop growing season. Furthermore, after cover crop termination, the yellow sweetclover residues suppressed weeds to levels 75–97% lower than in fallow (no yellow sweetclover) systems.

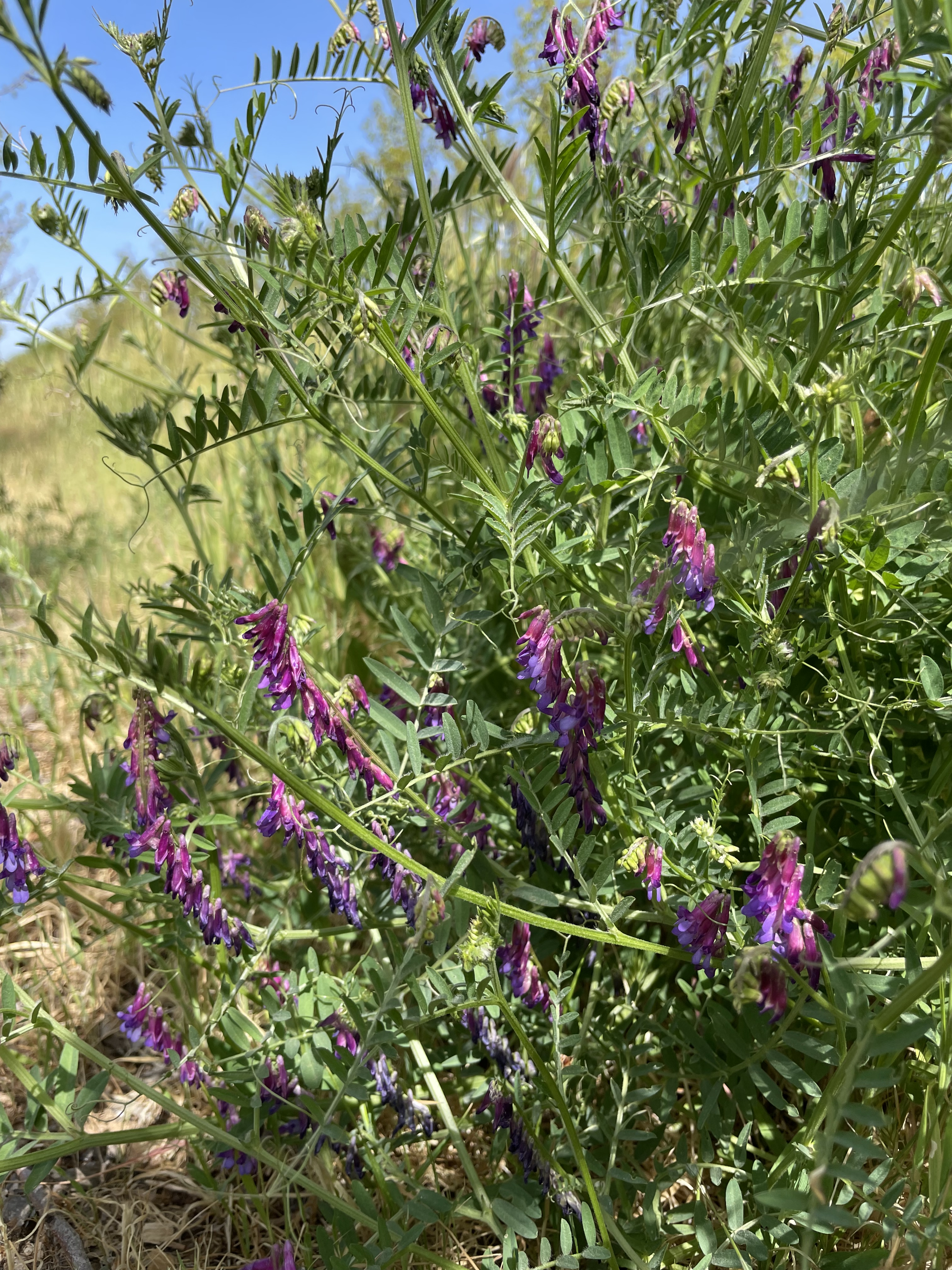
Hairy vetch (Vicia villosa) cover crop

In addition to competition-based or physical weed suppression, certain cover crops are known to suppress weeds through allelopathy. This occurs when certain biochemical cover crop compounds are degraded that happen to be toxic to, or inhibit seed germination of, other plant species. Some well known examples of allelopathic cover crops are Secale cereale (rye), Vicia villosa (hairy vetch), Trifolium pratense (red clover), Sorghum bicolor (sorghum-sudangrass), and species in the family Brassicaceae, particularly mustards. In one study, rye cover crop residues were found to have provided between 80% and 95% control of early season broadleaf weeds when used as a mulch during the production of different cash crops such as soybean, tobacco, corn, and sunflower. In general, cover crops need not compete with cash crops, as they can be grown and terminated early on the season before other crops are established.

In a 2010 study released by the Agricultural Research Service (ARS), scientists examined how rye seeding rates and planting patterns affected cover crop production. The results show that planting more pounds per acre of rye increased the cover crop's production as well as decreased the amount of weeds. The same was true when scientists tested seeding rates on legumes and oats; a higher density of seeds planted per acre decreased the amount of weeds and increased the yield of legume and oat production. The planting patterns, which consisted of either traditional rows or grid patterns, did not seem to have a significant impact on the cover crop's production or on the weed production in either cover crop. The ARS scientists concluded that increased seeding rates could be an effective method of weed control.

Cornell University's Sustainable Cropping Systems Lab released a study in May 2023 investigating the effectiveness of time-sensitive planting and strategic coupling of cover crop variants with phylogenetically similar cash crops. The primary researcher, Uriel Menalled, discovered that if cover and cash crops are planted in accordance with his research findings, farmers can decrease weed growth by up to 99%. The study provides farmers with a comprehensive framework to identify cover crops that would best suit their existing cropping rotations. In sum, the results from this study support an understanding that phylogenetic relatedness can be harnessed to significantly suppress weed growth.

== Disease management ==
In the same way that allelopathic properties of cover crops can suppress weeds, they can also break disease cycles and reduce populations of bacterial and fungal diseases, and parasitic nematodes. Species in the family Brassicaceae, such as mustards, have been widely shown to suppress fungal disease populations through the release of naturally occurring toxic chemicals during the degradation of glucosinolate compounds in their plant cell tissues.

== Pest management ==
Some cover crops are used as trap crops, to attract pests away from the crop of value and toward what the pest sees as a more favorable habitat. Trap crop areas can be established within crops, within farms, or within landscapes. In many cases, the trap crop is grown during the same season as the food crop being produced. The limited area occupied by these trap crops can be treated with a pesticide once pests are drawn to the trap in large enough numbers to reduce pest populations. In some organic systems, farmers drive over the trap crop with a large vacuum-based implement to physically pull the pests off the plants and out of the field. This system has been recommended for use to help control the lygus bugs in organic strawberry production. Another example of trap crops is nematode-resistant white mustard (Sinapis alba) and radish (Raphanus sativus). They can be grown after a main (cereal) crop and trap nematodes, for example, the beet cyst nematode and the Columbian root knot nematode. When grown, nematodes hatch and are attracted to the roots. After entering the roots they cannot reproduce in the root due to a hypersensitive resistance reaction of the plant. Hence the nematode population is greatly reduced, by 70–99%, depending on species and cultivation time.

Other cover crops are used to attract natural predators of pests by imitating elements of their habitat. This is a form of biological control known as habitat augmentation, but achieved with the use of cover crops. Findings on the relationship between cover crop presence and predator–pest population dynamics have been mixed, suggesting the need for detailed information on specific cover crop types and management practices to best complement a given integrated pest management strategy. For example, the predator mite Euseius tularensis is known to help control the pest citrus thrips in Central California citrus orchards. Researchers found that the planting of several different leguminous cover crops (such as bell bean, woollypod vetch, New Zealand white clover, and Austrian winter pea) provided sufficient pollen as a feeding source to cause a seasonal increase in E. tularensis populations, which with good could potentially introduce enough predatory pressure to reduce pest populations of citrus thrips.

Cover crops have a role beyond just trap crops and habitat for natural enemies. Cover crops can contribute to pest management by improving soil health and disrupting pest and disease cycles. Grasses, legumes, and brassicas have been shown to reduce erosion, increase soil organic matter, and enhance microbial activity, supporting more resilient cash crops and reducing yield loss to insect pests and pathogens.. Furthermore, intercropping and maintaining living cover between crop rows can be seen In several systems to promote abundance and diversity of natural predators, strengthening biological control..

== Biodiversity and wildlife ==
Although cover crops are generally used to serve one of the above-discussed purposes, they often serve as habitats for wildlife. Cover crops add at least one more dimension of plant diversity to a cash crop rotation. Since the cover crop is typically not a crop of value, its management is usually less intensive, providing a window of "soft" human influence on the farm. This relatively "hands-off" management, combined with the increased on-farm heterogeneity produced by the establishment of cover crops, increases the likelihood that a more complex trophic structure will develop to support a higher level of wildlife diversity.

In one study, researchers compared arthropod and songbird species composition and field use between conventionally and cover cropped cotton fields in the Southern United States. The cover cropped cotton fields were planted to clover, which was left to grow in between cotton rows throughout the early cotton growing season (stripcover cropping). During the migration and breeding season, they found that songbird densities were 7–20 times higher in the cotton fields with an integrated clover cover crop than in the conventional cotton fields. Arthropod abundance and biomass was also higher in the clover c-cover fields throughout much of the songbird breeding season, which was attributed to an increased supply of flower nectar from the clover. The clover cover crop enhanced songbird habitat by providing covering sites, and an increased food source from higher arthropod populations.

== See also ==
- Agroecology – Study of ecological processes in agriculture
- Allelopathy – Production of biochemicals which affect the growth of other organisms
- Biological control – Controlling pests using other organisms
- Green manure – Organic material left on an agricultural field to be used as a mulch or soil amendment
- Ground cover – Plant with low spreading growth
- Nitrogen cycle – Biogeochemical cycle by which nitrogen is converted into various chemical forms
- Nitrogen fixation – Conversion of dinitrogen into ammonia
- Organic matter – Matter composed of organic compounds
- Soil contamination – Pollution of land by human-made chemicals or other alteration
