= Euseius ugandaensis =

Scientific classification
- Kingdom: Animalia
- Phylum: Arthropoda
- Subphylum: Chelicerata
- Class: Arachnida
- Order: Mesostigmata
- Family: Phytoseiidae
- Genus: Euseius
- Species: E. ugandaensis

Binomial name
- Euseius ugandaensis Moraes, Ueckermann & Oliveira in Moraes, Ueckermann, Oliveira & Yaninek 2001

Species of mite

Euseius ugandaensis is a species of mite in the family Phytoseiidae.
