= Euseius aferulus =

Scientific classification
- Kingdom: Animalia
- Phylum: Arthropoda
- Subphylum: Chelicerata
- Class: Arachnida
- Order: Mesostigmata
- Family: Phytoseiidae
- Genus: Euseius
- Species: E. aferulus

Binomial name
- Euseius aferulus (Chant, 1959)

Species of mite

Euseius aferulus is a species of mite in the family Phytoseiidae.
