= Euseius elinae =

Scientific classification
- Kingdom: Animalia
- Phylum: Arthropoda
- Subphylum: Chelicerata
- Class: Arachnida
- Order: Mesostigmata
- Family: Phytoseiidae
- Genus: Euseius
- Species: E. elinae

Binomial name
- Euseius elinae (Schicha, 1977)

Species of mite

Euseius elinae is a species of mite in the family Phytoseiidae. It is also known as Amblyseius elinae.
