= Euseius mba =

Scientific classification
- Kingdom: Animalia
- Phylum: Arthropoda
- Subphylum: Chelicerata
- Class: Arachnida
- Order: Mesostigmata
- Family: Phytoseiidae
- Genus: Euseius
- Species: E. mba

Binomial name
- Euseius mba (Pritchard & Baker, 1962)

Species of mite

Euseius mba is a species of mite in the family Phytoseiidae.
