= Euseius mediocris =

Scientific classification
- Kingdom: Animalia
- Phylum: Arthropoda
- Subphylum: Chelicerata
- Class: Arachnida
- Order: Mesostigmata
- Family: Phytoseiidae
- Genus: Euseius
- Species: E. mediocris

Binomial name
- Euseius mediocris Chaudhri, Akbar & Rasool, 1979

Species of mite

Euseius mediocris is a species of mite in the family Phytoseiidae.
