= Euseius okumae =

Scientific classification
- Kingdom: Animalia
- Phylum: Arthropoda
- Subphylum: Chelicerata
- Class: Arachnida
- Order: Mesostigmata
- Family: Phytoseiidae
- Genus: Euseius
- Species: E. okumae

Binomial name
- Euseius okumae (Ehara & Bhandhufalck, 1977)

Species of mite

Euseius okumae is a species of mite in the family Phytoseiidae.
