= Euseius pafuriensis =

Scientific classification
- Kingdom: Animalia
- Phylum: Arthropoda
- Subphylum: Chelicerata
- Class: Arachnida
- Order: Mesostigmata
- Family: Phytoseiidae
- Genus: Euseius
- Species: E. pafuriensis

Binomial name
- Euseius pafuriensis (van der Merwe, 1968)

Species of mite

Euseius pafuriensis is a species of mite in the family Phytoseiidae. It was first described and named by scientist van der Merwe in 1968.
