= Euseius ghilarovi =

Scientific classification
- Kingdom: Animalia
- Phylum: Arthropoda
- Subphylum: Chelicerata
- Class: Arachnida
- Order: Mesostigmata
- Family: Phytoseiidae
- Genus: Euseius
- Species: E. ghilarovi

Binomial name
- Euseius ghilarovi Kolodochka, 1988

Species of mite

Euseius ghilarovi is a species of mite in the family Phytoseiidae.
