= Euseius alterno =

Scientific classification
- Kingdom: Animalia
- Phylum: Arthropoda
- Subphylum: Chelicerata
- Class: Arachnida
- Order: Mesostigmata
- Family: Phytoseiidae
- Genus: Euseius
- Species: E. alterno

Binomial name
- Euseius alterno Qayyum, Akbar & Afzal, 2001

Species of mite

Euseius alterno is a species of mite in the family Phytoseiidae.
