= Euseius concordis =

Scientific classification
- Kingdom: Animalia
- Phylum: Arthropoda
- Subphylum: Chelicerata
- Class: Arachnida
- Order: Mesostigmata
- Family: Phytoseiidae
- Genus: Euseius
- Species: E. concordis

Binomial name
- Euseius concordis (Chant, 1959)

Species of mite

Euseius concordis is a species of mite in the family Phytoseiidae.

The phytoseiidae family is considered to be one of best known examples of a predatory mite. Species belonging to the phytoseiidae family are classified as food generalists, this means their diets consist of an array of food sources, including nectar, pollen, and even other species of mite. E. concordius is abundant in northeastern Brazil and has been documented to prey on pest species such as Eriophyidae (the tomato russet mite). Due to its potential to be a biological pest control, the studies involving Euseius concordius typically involve agriculture.
