= Euseius aizawai =

Scientific classification
- Kingdom: Animalia
- Phylum: Arthropoda
- Subphylum: Chelicerata
- Class: Arachnida
- Order: Mesostigmata
- Family: Phytoseiidae
- Genus: Euseius
- Species: E. aizawai

Binomial name
- Euseius aizawai (Ehara & Bhandhufalck, 1977)

Species of mite

Euseius aizawai is a species of mite in the family Phytoseiidae.
