= Euseius beninensis =

Scientific classification
- Kingdom: Animalia
- Phylum: Arthropoda
- Subphylum: Chelicerata
- Class: Arachnida
- Order: Mesostigmata
- Family: Phytoseiidae
- Genus: Euseius
- Species: E. beninensis

Binomial name
- Euseius beninensis Moraes & McMurtry, 1989

Species of mite

Euseius beninensis is a species of mite in the family Phytoseiidae.
