= Euseius ricinus =

Scientific classification
- Kingdom: Animalia
- Phylum: Arthropoda
- Subphylum: Chelicerata
- Class: Arachnida
- Order: Mesostigmata
- Family: Phytoseiidae
- Genus: Euseius
- Species: E. ricinus

Binomial name
- Euseius ricinus Moraes, Denmark & Guerrero, 1982

Species of mite

Euseius ricinus is a species of mite in the family Phytoseiidae.
