= Euseius alangii =

Scientific classification
- Kingdom: Animalia
- Phylum: Arthropoda
- Subphylum: Chelicerata
- Class: Arachnida
- Order: Mesostigmata
- Family: Phytoseiidae
- Genus: Euseius
- Species: E. alangii

Binomial name
- Euseius alangii (K.e.Liang, 1981)

Species of arachnid

Euseius alangii is a species of mite in the family Phytoseiidae.
