= Euseius =

Scientific classification
- Kingdom: Animalia
- Phylum: Arthropoda
- Subphylum: Chelicerata
- Class: Arachnida
- Order: Mesostigmata
- Family: Phytoseiidae
- Genus: Euseius; De Leon, 1967

Genus of mites

Euseius is a genus of mites in the Phytoseiidae family.

== Species ==
- Euseius aferulus (Chant, 1959)
- Euseius affinis Qayyum, Akbar & Afzal, 2001
- Euseius africanus (Evans, 1954)
- Euseius ahaioensis (Gupta, 1992)
- Euseius aizawai (Ehara & Bhandhufalck, 1977)
- Euseius alangii (Liang & Ke, 1981)
- Euseius alatus De Leon, 1966
- Euseius albizziae (Swirski & Ragusa, 1978)
- Euseius aleyrodis (El-Badry, 1967)
- Euseius alstoniae (Gupta, 1975)
- Euseius alterno Qayyum, Akbar & Afzal, 2001
- Euseius amabilis Khan, Chaudhri & Khan, 1992
- Euseius amissibilis Meshkov, 1991
- Euseius andrei (Ueckermann & Loots, 1988)
- Euseius apsheronica Abbasova & Mekhtieva, 1991
- Euseius australis (Wu & Li, 1983)
- Euseius badius Khan & Chaudhri, 1991
- Euseius baetae (Meyer & Rodrigues, 1966)
- Euseius bambusae (Ghai & Menon, 1967)
- Euseius batus (Ueckermann & Loots, 1988)
- Euseius beninensis Moraes & McMurtry in Moraes, McMurtry & Yaninek 1989
- Euseius brazilli (El-Banhawy, 1975)
- Euseius brevifistulae Karg, 1997
- Euseius bwende (Pritchard & Baker, 1962)
- Euseius caseariae De Leon, 1967
- Euseius castaneae (Wang & Xu, 1987)
- Euseius circellatus (Wu & Li, 1983)
- Euseius citri (van der Merwe & Ryke, 1964)
- Euseius citrifolius Denmark & Muma, 1970
- Euseius coccineae (Gupta, 1975)
- Euseius coccosocius (Ghai & Menon, 1967)
- Euseius concordis (Chant, 1959)
- Euseius consors (De Leon, 1962)
- Euseius densus (Wu, 1984)
- Euseius dossei (Pritchard & Baker, 1962)
- Euseius dowdi (Schicha, 1993)
- Euseius eitanae (Swirski & Amitai, 1965)
- Euseius elinae (Schicha, 1977)
- Euseius emanus (El-Banhawy, 1979)
- Euseius errabundus De Leon, 1967
- Euseius erugatus (van der Merwe & Ryke, 1964)
- Euseius eucalypti (Ghai & Menon, 1967)
- Euseius facundus (Khan & Chaudhri, 1969)
- Euseius finlandicus (Oudemans, 1915)
- Euseius fructicolus (Gonzalez & Schuster, 1962)
- Euseius fustis (Pritchard & Baker, 1962)
- Euseius ghilarovi Kolodochka, 1988
- Euseius guangxiensis (Wu, 1982)
- Euseius haramotoi (Prasad, 1968)
- Euseius hibisci (Chant, 1959)
- Euseius hima (Pritchard & Baker, 1962)
- Euseius ho (De Leon, 1965)
- Euseius hutu (Pritchard & Baker, 1962)
- Euseius inouei (Ehara & Moraes, 1998)
- Euseius insanus (Khan & Chaudhri, 1969)
- Euseius kalimpongensis (Gupta, 1969)
- Euseius kenyae (Swirski & Ragusa, 1978)
- Euseius kirghisicus (Kolodochka, 1979)
- Euseius lasalasi Denmark & Evans in Denmark, Evans, Aguilar, Vargas & Ochoa 1999
- Euseius lecodactylus Ueckermann, 1996
- Euseius lokele (Pritchard & Baker, 1962)
- Euseius longicervix (Liang & Ke, 1983)
- Euseius longiverticalis (Liang & Ke, 1983)
- Euseius macrospatulatus (Gupta, 1986)
- Euseius magucii (Meyer & Rodrigues, 1966)
- Euseius mangiferae (Ghai & Menon, 1967)
- Euseius mba (Pritchard & Baker, 1962)
- Euseius mediocris Chaudhri, Akbar & Rasool, 1979
- Euseius mesembrinus (Dean, 1957)
- Euseius minutisetus Moraes & McMurtry in Moraes, McMurtry, van den Berg & Yaninek 1989
- Euseius multimicropilis De Leon, 1967
- Euseius mundillovalis (Schicha, 1987)
- Euseius myrobalanus (Ueckermann & Loots, 1988)
- Euseius naindaimei (Chant & Baker, 1965)
- Euseius natalensis (van der Merwe, 1965)
- Euseius neococciniae (Gupta, 1978)
- Euseius neodossei Moraes, Ueckermann & Oliveira in Moraes, Ueckermann, Oliveira & Yaninek 2001
- Euseius neofustis Moraes & McMurtry, 1988
- Euseius neolokele Moraes, Ueckermann & Oliveira in Moraes, Ueckermann, Oliveira & Yaninek 2001
- Euseius neomagucii Ueckermann, Moraes & Oliveira in Moraes, Ueckermann, Oliveira & Yaninek 2001
- Euseius neovictoriensis (Schicha, 1979)
- Euseius nertitus (El-Badry, 1968)
- Euseius nicholsi (Ehara & Lee, 1971)
- Euseius nigeriaensis Moraes, Ueckermann & Oliveira in Moraes, Ueckermann, Oliveira & Yaninek 2001
- Euseius notatus (Chaudhri, 1968)
- Euseius noumeae (Schicha, 1979)
- Euseius nyalensis (El-Badry, 1968)
- Euseius obispensis Aponte & McMurtry, 1997
- Euseius obtectus Khan, Chaudhri & Khan, 1992
- Euseius odoratus Khan & Chaudhri, 1991
- Euseius okumae (Ehara & Bhandhufalck, 1977)
- Euseius olivi (Nasr & Abou-Awad, 1985)
- Euseius orcula Khan, Chaudhri & Khan, 1992
- Euseius orientalis (El-Badry, 1968)
- Euseius orygmus (Ueckermann & Loots, 1988)
- Euseius ovalis (Evans, 1953)
- Euseius ovaloides (Blommers, 1974)
- Euseius pafuriensis (van der Merwe, 1968)
- Euseius papayana (van der Merwe, 1965)
- Euseius passiflorus Denmark & Evans in Denmark, Evans, Aguilar, Vargas & Ochoa 1999
- Euseius plaudus Denmark & Muma, 1973
- Euseius plazo Ahmad, Yasmin & Chaudhri, 1987
- Euseius plebeius (van der Merwe, 1968)
- Euseius ploreraformis (Schicha & Corpuz-Raros, 1992)
- Euseius prolixus (van der Merwe, 1968)
- Euseius pruni (Gupta, 1975)
- Euseius querci (Liang & Ke, 1983)
- Euseius quetzali McMurtry in McMurtry, Badii & Congdon 1985
- Euseius relictus Chaudhri, Akbar & Rasool, 1979
- Euseius reticulatus Moraes, Ueckermann & Oliveira in Moraes, Ueckermann, Oliveira & Yaninek 2001
- Euseius rhododendronis (Gupta, 1970)
- Euseius ricinus Moraes, Denmark & Guerrero, 1982
- Euseius rotundus (Blommers, 1973)
- Euseius rubicolus (van der Merwe & Ryke, 1964)
- Euseius ruiliensis (Wu & Li, 1985)
- Euseius sacchari (Ghai & Menon, 1967)
- Euseius sacchari (Liang & Ke, 1983)
- Euseius sakagamii (Ehara, 1966)
- Euseius scutalis (Athias-Henriot, 1958)
- Euseius semotus Ashmad, Yasmin & Chaudhri, 1987
- Euseius septicus Chaudhri, Akbar & Rasool, 1979
- Euseius sibelius (De Leon, 1962)
- Euseius similiovalis (Liang & Ke, 1983)
- Euseius sojaensis (Ehara, 1964)
- Euseius spermahyphus (Ueckermann & Loots, 1988)
- Euseius stipulatus (Athias-Henriot, 1960)
- Euseius subalatus (De Leon, 1965)
- Euseius subplebeius (Wu & Li, 1984)
- Euseius talinga (Pritchard & Baker, 1962)
- Euseius terenos Ahmad, Yasmin & Chaudhri, 1987
- Euseius transvaalensis (van der Merwe & Ryke, 1964)
- Euseius tularensis Congdon in Congdon & McMurtry 1985
- Euseius tutsi (Pritchard & Baker, 1962)
- Euseius ucrainicus (Kolodochka, 1979)
- Euseius ugandaensis Moraes, Ueckermann & Oliveira in Moraes, Ueckermann, Oliveira & Yaninek 2001
- Euseius unisetus Moraes & McMurtry, 1983
- Euseius urceus (De Leon, 1962)
- Euseius utilis (Liang & Ke, 1983)
- Euseius vanderbergae (Ueckermann & Loots, 1988)
- Euseius victoriensis (Womersley, 1954)
- Euseius vignus Rishi & Rather, 1983
- Euseius vitrum Ahmad, Yasmin & Chaudhri, 1987
- Euseius vulgaris (Liang & Ke, 1983)
- Euseius wyebo (Schicha & Corpuz-Raros, 1992)
- Euseius yousefi (Zaher & El-Brollosy, 1986)
- Euseius zairensis Moraes, Ueckermann & Oliveira in Moraes, Ueckermann, Oliveira & Yaninek 2001
- Euseius zambiaensis Moraes, Ueckermann & Oliveira in Moraes, Ueckermann, Oliveira & Yaninek 2001
