= Euseius nicholsi =

Scientific classification
- Kingdom: Animalia
- Phylum: Arthropoda
- Subphylum: Chelicerata
- Class: Arachnida
- Order: Mesostigmata
- Family: Phytoseiidae
- Genus: Euseius
- Species: E. nicholsi

Binomial name
- Euseius nicholsi (Ehara & Lee, 1971)

Species of mite

Euseius nicholsi is a species of mite in the family Phytoseiidae.
