= Euseius plazo =

Scientific classification
- Kingdom: Animalia
- Phylum: Arthropoda
- Subphylum: Chelicerata
- Class: Arachnida
- Order: Mesostigmata
- Family: Phytoseiidae
- Genus: Euseius
- Species: E. plazo

Binomial name
- Euseius plazo Ahmad, Yasmin & Chaudhri, 1987

Species of mite

Euseius plazo is a species of mite in the family Phytoseiidae.
