= Euseius querci =

Scientific classification
- Kingdom: Animalia
- Phylum: Arthropoda
- Subphylum: Chelicerata
- Class: Arachnida
- Order: Mesostigmata
- Family: Phytoseiidae
- Genus: Euseius
- Species: E. querci

Binomial name
- Euseius querci (K.e.Liang, 1983)

Species of mite

Euseius querci is a species of mite in the family Phytoseiidae.
