= Euseius neofustis =

Scientific classification
- Kingdom: Animalia
- Phylum: Arthropoda
- Subphylum: Chelicerata
- Class: Arachnida
- Order: Mesostigmata
- Family: Phytoseiidae
- Genus: Euseius
- Species: E. neofustis

Binomial name
- Euseius neofustis Moraes & McMurtry, 1988

Species of mite

Euseius neofustis is a species of mite in the family Phytoseiidae.
