= Euseius orcula =

Scientific classification
- Kingdom: Animalia
- Phylum: Arthropoda
- Subphylum: Chelicerata
- Class: Arachnida
- Order: Mesostigmata
- Family: Phytoseiidae
- Genus: Euseius
- Species: E. orcula

Binomial name
- Euseius orcula Khan, Chaudhri & Khan, 1992

Species of mite

Euseius orcula is a species of mite in the family Phytoseiidae.
