= Euseius coccosocius =

Scientific classification
- Kingdom: Animalia
- Phylum: Arthropoda
- Subphylum: Chelicerata
- Class: Arachnida
- Order: Mesostigmata
- Family: Phytoseiidae
- Genus: Euseius
- Species: E. coccosocius

Binomial name
- Euseius coccosocius (Ghai & Menon, 1967)

Species of mite

Euseius coccosocius is a species of mite in the family Phytoseiidae.
