= Euseius olivi =

Scientific classification
- Kingdom: Animalia
- Phylum: Arthropoda
- Subphylum: Chelicerata
- Class: Arachnida
- Order: Mesostigmata
- Family: Phytoseiidae
- Genus: Euseius
- Species: E. olivi

Binomial name
- Euseius olivi (Nasr & Abou-Awad, 1985)

Species of mite

Euseius olivi is a species of mite in the family Phytoseiidae.
