= Euseius prolixus =

Scientific classification
- Kingdom: Animalia
- Phylum: Arthropoda
- Subphylum: Chelicerata
- Class: Arachnida
- Order: Mesostigmata
- Family: Phytoseiidae
- Genus: Euseius
- Species: E. prolixus

Binomial name
- Euseius prolixus (van der Merwe, 1968)

Species of mite

Euseius prolixus is a species of mite in the family Phytoseiidae.
