= Euseius myrobalanus =

Scientific classification
- Kingdom: Animalia
- Phylum: Arthropoda
- Subphylum: Chelicerata
- Class: Arachnida
- Order: Mesostigmata
- Family: Phytoseiidae
- Genus: Euseius
- Species: E. myrobalanus

Binomial name
- Euseius myrobalanus (Ueckermann & Loots, 1988)

Species of mite

Euseius myrobalanus is a species of mite in the family Phytoseiidae.
