= Euseius ucrainicus =

Scientific classification
- Kingdom: Animalia
- Phylum: Arthropoda
- Subphylum: Chelicerata
- Class: Arachnida
- Order: Mesostigmata
- Family: Phytoseiidae
- Genus: Euseius
- Species: E. ucrainicus

Binomial name
- Euseius ucrainicus (Kolodochka, 1979)

Species of mite

Euseius ucrainicus is a species of mite in the family Phytoseiidae.
