= Euseius inouei =

Scientific classification
- Kingdom: Animalia
- Phylum: Arthropoda
- Subphylum: Chelicerata
- Class: Arachnida
- Order: Mesostigmata
- Family: Phytoseiidae
- Genus: Euseius
- Species: E. inouei

Binomial name
- Euseius inouei (Ehara & Moraes, 1998)

Species of mite

Euseius inouei is a species of mite in the family Phytoseiidae originally observed by Shozo Ehara and Gilberto Moraes in Uruguay in 1998. It is named in honor of Dr. Kouichi Inoue of the Instituto Nacional de Investigacion Agropecuaria (INIA) located within Colonia Gestido in the Salto Grande, Uruguay.
