= Euseius reticulatus =

Scientific classification
- Kingdom: Animalia
- Phylum: Arthropoda
- Subphylum: Chelicerata
- Class: Arachnida
- Order: Mesostigmata
- Family: Phytoseiidae
- Genus: Euseius
- Species: E. reticulatus

Binomial name
- Euseius reticulatus Moraes, Ueckermann & Oliveira, 2001

Species of mite

Euseius reticulatus is a species of mite in the family Phytoseiidae.
