= Euseius hibisci =

Scientific classification
- Kingdom: Animalia
- Phylum: Arthropoda
- Subphylum: Chelicerata
- Class: Arachnida
- Order: Mesostigmata
- Family: Phytoseiidae
- Genus: Euseius
- Species: E. hibisci

Binomial name
- Euseius hibisci (Chant, 1959)

Species of mite

Euseius hibisci is a species of mite in the family Phytoseiidae. It is found in Europe.
