= Euseius facundus =

Scientific classification
- Kingdom: Animalia
- Phylum: Arthropoda
- Subphylum: Chelicerata
- Class: Arachnida
- Order: Mesostigmata
- Family: Phytoseiidae
- Genus: Euseius
- Species: E. facundus

Binomial name
- Euseius facundus (Khan & Chaudhri, 1969)

Species of mite

Euseius facundus is a species of mite in the family Phytoseiidae.
