= Euseius mangiferae =

Scientific classification
- Kingdom: Animalia
- Phylum: Arthropoda
- Subphylum: Chelicerata
- Class: Arachnida
- Order: Mesostigmata
- Family: Phytoseiidae
- Genus: Euseius
- Species: E. mangiferae

Binomial name
- Euseius mangiferae (Ghai & Menon, 1967)

Species of mite

Euseius mangiferae is a species of mite in the family Phytoseiidae.

== Habitat and ecology ==
This species is commonly found in mango orchards, especially on leaves and buds, where they act as natural enemies of mite pests.

== Diet ==
This species typically feeds on eriophyid mites, such as spider mites.
