= List of mites of Sri Lanka =

Sri Lanka is a tropical island situated close to the southern tip of India. The invertebrate fauna is as large as it is common to other regions of the world. There are about 2 million species of arthropods found in the world, and still it is counting. So many new species are discover up to this time also. So it is very complicated and difficult to summarize the exact number of species found within a certain region.

The following list provide mites currently identified in Sri Lanka.

== Mites ==
- Phylum: Arthropoda
- Class: Arachnida
- Subclass: Acari
- Superorder: Parasitiformes
- Superorder: Acariformes

Mites, along with ticks, are small arthropods belonging to the subclass Acari (also known as Acarina) and the class Arachnida. The scientific discipline devoted to the study of ticks and mites is called acarology. In soil ecosystems, mites are favored by high organic matter content and by moist conditions, wherein they actively engage in the fragmentation and mixing of organic matter.

Mites are among the most diverse and successful of all the invertebrate groups. They have exploited an incredible array of habitats, and because of their small size (most are microscopic), go largely unnoticed. Many live freely in the soil or water, but there are also a large number of species that live as parasites on plants, animals, and some that feed on mold. It is estimated that 48,200 species of mites have been described. Mites diversity of Sri Lanka is not fully studied largely as did to ticks. Most of the works on mites are associated with crop pests and human diseases by mites. Some mites were found within human bodies such as ears and eyelashes. In 2020, four new water mites were described.

Endemic species are denoted as E.

=== Order: Acariformes - Ticks ===
==== Family: Pyroglyphidae - House dust mites ====
- Dermatophagoides pteronyssinus

=== Order: Mesostigmata - Predatory mites ===
==== Family: Phytoseiidae - Phytoseiid mites ====
- Amblyseius californicus
- Amblyseius adathodae
- Amblyseius duplicesetus
- Amblyseius largoensis
- Amblyseius tamatavensis
- Euseius alstoniae
- Euseius ceylonicus
- Euseius ovalis
- Euseius pauciventripilis
- Euseius sacchari
- EuseiIndoseiulus liturivorus
- Neoseiulus baraki
- Neoseiulus longispinosus
- Neoseiulus paspalivorus
- Paraphytoseius seychellensis
- Phytoseiulus persimilis
- Phytoseius calopogonium
- Phytoseius mayottae
- Proprioseiopsis ovatus
- Typhlodromips asiaticus
- Typhlodromips tetranychivorus
- Typhlodromus bifurcutus

=== Order: Prostigmata - True mites ===
==== Family: Eriophyidae - Gall mites ====
- Aceria guerreronis
- Aceria largoensis

==== Family: Tenuipalpidae - Flat mites ====
- Dolichotetranychus sp.

=== Order: Trombidiformes - Trombidiform mites ===
==== Family: Tetranychidae - Water mites ====
- Krendowskia srilankana
- Mideopsis ewelinae
- Neumania edytae
- Piona srilankana

==== Family: Tetranychidae - Spider mites ====
- Oligonychus coffeae
- Tetranychus telarius
