= Amblyseius anacardii =

Scientific classification
- Kingdom: Animalia
- Phylum: Arthropoda
- Subphylum: Chelicerata
- Class: Arachnida
- Order: Mesostigmata
- Family: Phytoseiidae
- Genus: Amblyseius
- Species: A. anacardii

Binomial name
- Amblyseius anacardii De Leon, 1967

Species of mite

Amblyseius anacardii is a species of mite belonging to the genus Amblyseius in the family Phytoseiidae.

== Distribution ==
The first documentation of the species was in 1967, with the first specimens being discovered in Colombia. Later on in 1972, more specimens of the species were observed during an expedition to Colombia, being found alongside eleven other related species in the Phytoseiid family. Since then, the species has been encountered outside the country. In 2021, the species was discovered to be relatively common within the Antilles, and has been also found in Central America. The species is theorized to have a wider distribution, with a single specimen being found as far as French Guiana.

== Description ==
The species is observed to bear a resemblance to Amblyseius coffea, a related species observed in Mexico. A. anacardii can be distinguished from A. coffea by the shape of its spermatheca. A. anacardii is also comparable to Amblyseius rackae. However, A. anacardii is noted to have significantly shorter legs and a differently shaped insemination apparatus.

Despite radical differences in distribution locations, the species is theorized to be the closest relative of Amblyseius cucurbitae, due to strong similarities in anatomy.

== Behavior ==
Consistent with other members of its family, A. anacardii is a predatory mite. A study by the University of São Paulo found the species solely feeds upon other plant mites.

Despite the reputation of Phytoseiidae species as biological control agents, A. anacardii is observed to be a pest. The species is known to cause harm to the plant Citrus sinensis, disrupting agriculture in the region. The damage caused by A. anacardii and other related mite species has been observed to be elevated by the introduction of other local predatory mites such as Neoseiulus anonymus, Neoseiulus californicus, Iphiseiodes zuluagai and Amblyseius herbicolus to affected plants. The species is also naturally victim to predation by many commercially available predatory mites used frequently to protect crops in the region. In addition to feeding on C. sinensis, the species has also been observed using Passiflora edulis and Anacardium occidentale as hosts.
