= Amblyseius sellnicki =

Scientific classification
- Kingdom: Animalia
- Phylum: Arthropoda
- Subphylum: Chelicerata
- Class: Arachnida
- Order: Mesostigmata
- Family: Phytoseiidae
- Genus: Amblyseius
- Species: A. sellnicki

Binomial name
- Amblyseius sellnicki (Karg, 1960)

Species of mite

Amblyseius sellnicki is a species of mite in the family Phytoseiidae.
