= Amblyseius bidens =

Scientific classification
- Kingdom: Animalia
- Phylum: Arthropoda
- Subphylum: Chelicerata
- Class: Arachnida
- Order: Mesostigmata
- Family: Phytoseiidae
- Genus: Amblyseius
- Species: A. bidens

Binomial name
- Amblyseius bidens Karg, 1970

Species of mite

Amblyseius bidens is a species of mite belonging to the genus Amblyseius in the family Phytoseiidae.

== Distribution ==
A. bidens is observed to have a wide distribution, being found across Europe. The species was first documented by the zoologist Wolfgang Karg in 1970, detailing specimens found in Germany. In addition, the species is among the most abundant mite species of the grasslands of Austria. Specimens of the species have been found to be concentrated in the mountainous regions of southeastern Slovakia.

The species is not confined to mainline Europe, the species is observed among many others inhabiting peatlands in Ireland.

== Description ==
Initial descriptions of A. bidens by Karg were not particularly detailed. The species is observed to have a smooth and idiosomal patterned body. Both sexes have a distinguishing and large genital shield. The legs of the species are uneven, with fewer sections on the right legs than the left.

The species exhibits strong sexual dimorphism. Females are noticeably larger, have more teeth, and more mobile chelicera.

Comparatively, the species is visually similar to Amblyseius myrtilli, a related species of mite commonly found on European Blueberry. A. bidens can be distinguished by its dorsal shield, which has five solenostomes as opposed to the seven found on A. myrtilli. The spermatheca of A. bidens is nearly identical Neoseiulus roumelioticus.

== Behavior ==
Similar to other predatory mites, A. bidens is considered a natural biological control against agricultural pests in its native habitat. The species primarily consumes grasses, with it showing a preference for younger plants that have only recently reached maturity.

The species is observed to primarily inhabit the soil of wet and grassy environments. This is in addition to the species being observed living in the nests of birds, a behavior usually exclusive to parasitic mites, rather than predatory mites.
