= Amblyseius tubae =

Scientific classification
- Kingdom: Animalia
- Phylum: Arthropoda
- Subphylum: Chelicerata
- Class: Arachnida
- Order: Mesostigmata
- Family: Phytoseiidae
- Genus: Amblyseius
- Species: A. tubae

Binomial name
- Amblyseius tubae Karg, 1970

Species of mite

Amblyseius tubae is a species of mite in the family Phytoseiidae. It is found in Europe.
