= A. americanus =

A. americanus may refer to:

An abbreviation of a species name. In binomial nomenclature the name of a species is always the name of the genus to which the species belongs, followed by the species name (also called the species epithet). In A. americanus the genus name has been abbreviated to A. and the species has been spelled out in full. In a document that uses this abbreviation it should always be clear from the context which genus name has been abbreviated.

Some of the most common uses of A. americanus are:

- Acorus americanus, a sweet flag
- Alces americanus, or North American moose, a mammal
- Amblyseius americanus, a mite
- Ammodytes americanus, a sandlance
- Anacanthobatis americanus, a ray
- Apogon americanus, a cardinalfish
- Aprostocetus americanus, a hymenopteran insect
- Arctus americanus, a lobster
- Argulus americanus, a fish louse
- Astragalus americanus, a milkvetch
- Astropecten americanus, a starfish

== See also ==
- Americanus (disambiguation)
