= A. orientalis =

A. orientalis may refer to:

- Acrocephalus orientalis, the Oriental Reed-warbler, a passerine bird species found in eastern Asia
- Amblyseius orientalis, a predatory mite species found on Hokkaidō, Japan
- Amorphoscelis orientalis, a praying mantis species native to Kenya, Somalia and Tanzania
- Amycolatopsis orientalis, a high-GC content bacterium species
- Anomala orientalis, the Oriental beetle, a beetle species native to Asia
- Anthreptes orientalis, the Eastern Violet-backed Sunbird or Kenya Violet-backed Sunbird, a bird species found from Djibouti to Tanzania
- Aplysiopsis orientalis, a sea slug species found in the northwestern Pacific Ocean
- Arborophila orientalis, the White-faced Hill-partridge, a bird species found only in Indonesia
- Asperula orientalis, the blue woodruff or Oriental asperula, a perennial plant species native to West Asia and Europe

== Synonyms ==
- Archaeobalbis orientalis, a synonym for Herochroma baibarana, a moth species found in China, Taiwan, Sri Lanka, the north-eastern parts of the Himalaya, Peninsular Malaysia, Sumatra and Borneo

== See also ==
- Orientalis (disambiguation)
