= Amblyseius adhatodae =

Scientific classification
- Kingdom: Animalia
- Phylum: Arthropoda
- Subphylum: Chelicerata
- Class: Arachnida
- Order: Mesostigmata
- Family: Phytoseiidae
- Genus: Amblyseius
- Species: A. adhatodae

Binomial name
- Amblyseius adhatodae Muma, 1967

Species of mite

Amblyseius adhatodae is a species of mite belonging to the genus Amblyseius in the family Phytoseiidae.

== Distribution ==
Specimens of A. adhatodae were first collected in Mumbai, India. Later specimens have been collected from southern India, consistent with the initial observations of the species. The species has since been observed to have a widespread distribution, with it being found outside the Indian subcontinent in Brazil and Kenya.

== Description ==
A. adhatodae is anatomically distinct from closely related mites. The spermatheca forms a long and distally flared tube, resembling a trumpet. Chelicerea of the species are distinguished by having ten to eleven tiny, fixed teeth. Legs of the species are notably longer than closely related species, such as Amblyseius largoensis. Initial descriptions of the species are very similar to more contemporary descriptions.

== Taxonomic History ==
A. adhatodae was first described in 1967 by the zoologist Martin Muma, who placed it in the Amblyseius genus created the previous year by Denmark De Leon.
