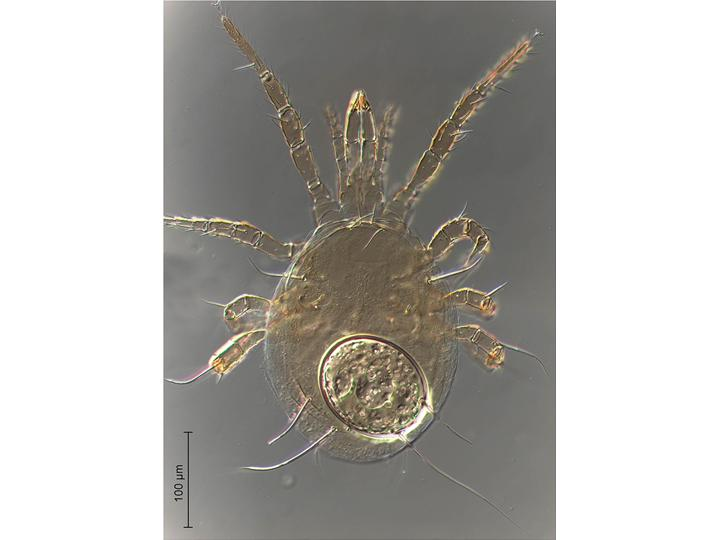
- Amblyseius largoensis

Scientific classification
- Kingdom: Animalia
- Phylum: Arthropoda
- Subphylum: Chelicerata
- Class: Arachnida
- Order: Mesostigmata
- Family: Phytoseiidae
- Genus: Amblyseius; Berlese, 1914

Type species
- Zercon obtusus Koch, 1839

= Amblyseius =

Genus of mites

Amblyseius is a large genus of predatory mites belonging to the family Phytoseiidae. Many members of this genus feed on other mites such as red spider mites, and also on thrips. Several species are popular as biological control agents to control these pests.

== Species ==
=== A ===
- Amblyseius abbasovae Wainstein & Beglyarov, 1971
- Amblyseius acalyphus Denmark & Muma, 1973
- Amblyseius adhatodae Muma, 1967
- Amblyseius adjaricus Wainstein & Vartapetov, 1972
- Amblyseius aequipilus Berlese, 1914
- Amblyseius aerialis (Muma, 1955)
- Amblyseius alpigenus Wu, 1987
- Amblyseius alpinia Tseng, 1983
- Amblyseius americanus Garman, 1948
- Amblyseius ampullosus Wu & Lan, 1991
- Amblyseius anacardii De Leon, 1967
- Amblyseius andersoni (Chant, 1957)
- Amblyseius angulatus Karg, 1982
- Amblyseius animos Khan, Afzal & Akbar, 2000
- Amblyseius ankaratrae Blommers, 1976
- Amblyseius anomalus van der Merwe, 1968
- Amblyseius araraticus Arutunjan & Ohandjanian, 1972
- Amblyseius aricae Karg, 1976
- Amblyseius armeniacus Arutunjan & Ohandjanian, 1972
- Amblyseius asperocervix McMurtry & Moraes, 1985

=== B ===
- Amblyseius bahiensis Lofego, Moraes & McMurtry, 2000
- Amblyseius bayonicus Athias-Henriot, 1966
- Amblyseius begljarovi Abbasova, 1970
- Amblyseius bellatulus Tseng, 1983
- Amblyseius bidens Karg, 1970
- Amblyseius bidibidi (Collyer, 1964)
- Amblyseius boina Blommers, 1976
- Amblyseius brevicervix Wu & Li, 1985
- Amblyseius bufortus Ueckermann & Loots, 1988
- Amblyseius bulga Khan, Khan & Akbar, 1997

=== C ===
- Amblyseius calidum Khan, Afzal & Akbar, 2000
- Amblyseius carnis Khan, Khan & Akbar, 1997
- Amblyseius caspiansis (Denmark & Daneshvar, 1982)
- Amblyseius caudatus Berlese, 1914
- Amblyseius caviphilus Karg, 1986
- Amblyseius celsus Khan, Khan & Akbar, 1997
- Amblyseius cessator De Leon, 1962
- Amblyseius changbaiensis Wu, 1987
- Amblyseius chanioticus Papadoulis, 1997
- Amblyseius channabasavannai Gupta & Daniel, in Gupta 1978
- Amblyseius chiapensis De Leon, 1961
- Amblyseius chilcotti Chant & Hansell, 1971
- Amblyseius chorites Schuster & Pritchard, 1963
- Amblyseius chungas Denmark & Muma, 1989
- Amblyseius cinctus Corpuz-Raros & Rimando, 1966
- Amblyseius circumflexis De Leon, 1966
- Amblyseius coffeae De Leon, 1961
- Amblyseius colimensis Aponte & McMurtry, 1987
- Amblyseius collaris Karg, 1983
- Amblyseius comatus Ueckermann & Loots, 1988
- Amblyseius compositus Denmark & Muma, 1973
- Amblyseius corderoi Chant & Baker, 1965
- Amblyseius crassicaudalis Karg, 1998
- Amblyseius crowleyi Congdon, 2002
- Amblyseius cucurbitae Rather, 1985
- Amblyseius cupulus Denmark & Muma, 1989
- Amblyseius curiosus (Chant & Baker, 1965)
- Amblyseius curticervicalis Moraes & Mesa, in Moraes, Mesa & Braun 1991
- Amblyseius cydonus Ueckermann & Loots, 1988

=== D ===
- Amblyseius daliensis Liang & Ke, 1984
- Amblyseius deductus Chaudhri, Akbar & Rasool, 1979
- Amblyseius deleonellus Athias-Henriot, 1967
- Amblyseius denticulosus (Hirschmann, 1962)
- Amblyseius divisus De Leon, 1961
- Amblyseius duncansoni Specht & Rasmy, 1970
- Amblyseius duplicesetus Moraes & McMurtry, 1988

=== E ===
- Amblyseius eharai Amitai & Swirski, 1981
- Amblyseius erlangensis (Hirschmann, 1962)
- Amblyseius euanalis (Karg, 1983)
- Amblyseius euterpes Gondim Jr. & Moraes, 2001
- Amblyseius euvertex Karg, 1983
- Amblyseius excelsus Chaudhri, Akbar & Rasool, 1979

=== F ===
- Amblyseius faerroni Denmark & Evans, in Denmark, Evans, Aguilar, Vargas & Ochoa 1999
- Amblyseius fernandezi Chant & Baker, 1965
- Amblyseius fieldsi Denmark & Muma, 1989
- Amblyseius fijiensis McMurtry & Moraes, 1984
- Amblyseius filicinae Karg, 1998
- Amblyseius filixis Karg, 1970
- Amblyseius firmus Ehara, 1967
- Amblyseius fletcheri Schicha, 1981
- Amblyseius foenalis Berlese, 1914
- Amblyseius forfex Khan, Khan & Akbar, 1997
- Amblyseius franzellus Athias-Henriot, 1967
- Amblyseius fraterculus Berlese, 1916

=== G ===
- Amblyseius genualis De Leon, 1967
- Amblyseius geonomae Gondim Jr. & Moraes, 2001
- Amblyseius gliricidii De Leon, 1961
- Amblyseius gracilis (Garman, 1958)
- Amblyseius gramineous Wu, Lan & Zhang, 1992
- Amblyseius graminis Chant, 1956
- Amblyseius gruberi Denmark & Muma, 1989
- Amblyseius guianensis De Leon, 1966
- Amblyseius guntheri McMurtry & Schicha, 1987

=== H ===
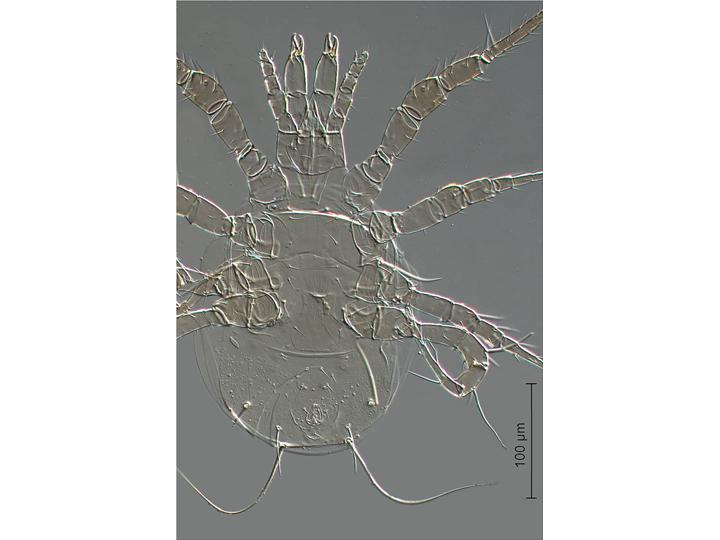
Amblyseius herbicolus

- Amblyseius hainanensis Wu, in Wu & Qian 1983
- Amblyseius haleakalus Prasad, 1968
- Amblyseius hederae Denmark & Muma, 1989
- Amblyseius herbicoloides McMurtry & Moraes, 1984
- Amblyseius herbicolus (Chant, 1959)
- Amblyseius hexadens Karg, 1983
- Amblyseius humilis Khan, Khan & Akbar, 1997
- Amblyseius hurlbutti Denmark & Muma, 1989

=== I ===
- Amblyseius igarassuensis Gondim Jr. & Moraes, 2001
- Amblyseius impeltatus Denmark & Muma, 1973
- Amblyseius impressus Denmark & Muma, 1973
- Amblyseius incognitus Schuster, 1966
- Amblyseius indirae Gupta, 1985
- Amblyseius indocalami Zhu & Chen, 1983
- Amblyseius infundibulatus Athias-Henriot, 1961
- Amblyseius intermedius Gonzalez & Schuster, 1962
- Amblyseius invictus Schuster, 1966
- Amblyseius ipomoeae Ghai & Menon, 1967
- Amblyseius irinae Wainstein & Arutunjan, 1973
- Amblyseius ishizuchiensis Ehara, 1972
- Amblyseius isuki Chant & Hansel, 1971
- Amblyseius italicus (Chant, 1959)

=== J ===
- Amblyseius jailensis Kolodochka, 1981
- Amblyseius januaricus Wainstein & Vartapetov, 1973
- Amblyseius jilinensis Wu, 1987
- Amblyseius juliae Schicha, 1983

=== k ===
- Amblyseius kadii El-Halawany & Abdel-Samad, 1990
- Amblyseius kadzhajai Gomelauri, 1968
- Amblyseius kaguya Ehara, 1966
- Amblyseius kalandadzei Gomelauri, 1968
- Amblyseius keni Schicha, 1987
- Amblyseius kokufuensis Ehara & Kato, in Ehara, Okada & Kato 1994
- Amblyseius koreaensis Denmark & Muma, 1989
- Amblyseius koumacensis Schicha, 1981
- Amblyseius kulini Gupta, 1978

=== L ===
- Amblyseius largoensis (Muma, 1955)
- Amblyseius laselvius (Denmark & Evans, 1999)
- Amblyseius lassus Schuster, 1966
- Amblyseius lemani Tencalla & Mathys, 1958
- Amblyseius lencus Denmark & Evans, in Denmark, Evans, Aguilar, Vargas & Ochoa 1999
- Amblyseius lentiginosus Denmark & Schicha, 1974
- Amblyseius leonardi McMurtry & Moraes, 1989
- Amblyseius lianshanus Zhu & Chen, 1980
- Amblyseius lituatus Athias-Henriot, 1961
- Amblyseius longicollis Denmark & Evans, in Denmark, Evans, Aguilar, Vargas & Ochoa 1999
- Amblyseius longimedius Wang & Xu, 1991
- Amblyseius longisaccatus Wu, Lan & Liu, 1995
- Amblyseius longulus Berlese, 1914
- Amblyseius lynnae McMurtry & Moraes, 1989

=== M ===
- Amblyseius magnoliae Muma, 1961
- Amblyseius mahabaeus Schicha & Corpuz-Raros, 1992
- Amblyseius malovi Beglyarov, 1981
- Amblyseius martini Collyer, 1982
- Amblyseius martus De Leon, 1966
- Amblyseius matinikus Schicha & Corpuz-Raros, 1992
- Amblyseius mazatlanus Denmark & Muma, 1989
- Amblyseius mcmurtryi Muma, 1967
- Amblyseius megaporos De Leon, 1961
- Amblyseius meghriensis Arutunjan, 1968
- Amblyseius meridionalis Berlese, 1914
- Amblyseius microorientalis Wainstein & Beglyarov, 1971
- Amblyseius modestus (Chant & Baker, 1965)
- Amblyseius monacus Wainstein, 1975
- Amblyseius morii Ehara, 1967
- Amblyseius mountus Ryu, 1995
- Amblyseius multidentatus (Chant, 1959)
- Amblyseius muraleedharani Gupta, 1986
- Amblyseius murteri Schweizer, 1961

=== N ===
- Amblyseius nahatius Schicha & Corpuz-Raros, 1992
- Amblyseius nambourensis Schicha, 1981
- Amblyseius nayaritensis De Leon, 1961
- Amblyseius nemorivagus Athias-Henriot, 1961
- Amblyseius neoankaratrae Ueckermann & Loots, 1988
- Amblyseius neobernhardi Athias-Henriot, 1966
- Amblyseius neochiapensis Lofego, Moraes & McMurtry, 2000
- Amblyseius neocinctus Schicha & Corpuz-Raros, 1992
- Amblyseius neofijiensis Wu, Lan & Liu, 1995
- Amblyseius neofirmus Ehara & Okada, in Ehara, Okada & Kato 1994
- Amblyseius neolargoensis van der Merwe, 1965
- Amblyseius neolentiginosus Schicha, 1979
- Amblyseius neopascalis Wu & Ou, 2001
- Amblyseius neoperditus Moraes & Mesa, in Moraes, Mesa & Braun 1991
- Amblyseius neorykei Gupta, 1977
- Amblyseius newelli (Chant, 1960)
- Amblyseius nicola Chant & Hansell, 1971
- Amblyseius nonfraterculus Schicha, 1987

=== O ===
- Amblyseius oatmani Denmark, 1974
- Amblyseius obtuserellus Wainstein & Beglyarov, 1971
- Amblyseius obtusus (Koch, 1839)
- Amblyseius ochii Ehara & Yokogawa, 1977
- Amblyseius omaloensis Gomelauri, 1968
- Amblyseius oocarpus (Denmark & Evans, 1999)
- Amblyseius operculatus De Leon, 1967
- Amblyseius orientalis Ehara, 1959
- Amblyseius ovalitectus van der Merwe, 1968

=== P ===
- Amblyseius pamperisi Papadoulis, 1997
- Amblyseius paraaerialis Muma, 1967
- Amblyseius parabufortus (Denmark & Evans, 1999)
- Amblyseius parakaguya Denmark & Edland, 2002
- Amblyseius parasundi Blommers, 1974
- Amblyseius pascalis Tseng, 1983
- Amblyseius passiflorae Blommers, 1974
- Amblyseius patellae Karg, 1982
- Amblyseius paucisetis Wainstein, 1983
- Amblyseius paucisetosus McMurtry & Moraes, 1985
- Amblyseius perditus Chant & Baker, 1965
- Amblyseius perlongisetus Berlese, 1916
- Amblyseius perplexus Denmark & Evans, in Denmark, Evans, Aguilar, Vargas & Ochoa 1999
- Amblyseius phillipsi McMurtry & Schicha, in McMurtry & Moraes 1984
- Amblyseius piracicabae (Denmark & Muma, 1973)
- Amblyseius polisensis Schicha & Corpuz-Raros, 1992
- Amblyseius pravus Denmark, 1977
- Amblyseius pretoriaensis Ueckermann & Loots, 1988
- Amblyseius pritchardellus Athias-Henriot, 1967
- Amblyseius proresinae Karg, 1970
- Amblyseius punctatus Muma, Metz & Farrier, 1967
- Amblyseius pustulosus Karg, 1994

=== Q ===
- Amblyseius quichua McMurtry & Moraes, 1989

=== R ===
- Amblyseius raoiellus Denmark & Muma, 1989
- Amblyseius readshawi Schicha, 1987
- Amblyseius rhabdus Denmark, 1965
- Amblyseius riodocei El-Banhawy, 1984

=== S ===
- Amblyseius salinellus Athias-Henriot, 1966
- Amblyseius saltus (Zack, 1969)
- Amblyseius sangangensis Zhu & Chen, 1983
- Amblyseius santoensis Schicha, 1981
- Amblyseius saopaulus Denmark & Muma, 1973
- Amblyseius saurus De Leon, 1962
- Amblyseius schusteri (Chant, 1959)
- Amblyseius sculpticollis Denmark & Evans, in Denmark, Evans, Aguilar, Vargas & Ochoa 1999
- Amblyseius segregans De Leon, 1966
- Amblyseius sellnicki (Karg, 1960)
- Amblyseius serratus Karg, 1976
- Amblyseius shiganus Ehara, 1972
- Amblyseius siddiqui Khan & Chaudhri, 1969
- Amblyseius silvaticus (Chant, 1959)
- Amblyseius similicaudalis Karg, 1998
- Amblyseius similifloridanus (Hirschmann, 1962)
- Amblyseius similoides Buchellos & Pritchard, 1960
- Amblyseius sinuatus De Leon, 1961
- Amblyseius sinuatus Zhu & Chen, 1980
- Amblyseius sobrinulus Athias-Henriot, 1967
- Amblyseius solani Ramos & Rodriguez, 1997
- Amblyseius solus Denmark & Matthysse, in Matthysse & Denmark 1981
- Amblyseius sorakensis Ryu, 1995
- Amblyseius sparsus Kolodochka, 1990
- Amblyseius spiculatus Denmark & Muma, 1973
- Amblyseius stramenti Karg, 1965
- Amblyseius strobocorycus Wu, Lan & Liu, 1995
- Amblyseius subpassiflorae Wu & Lan, 1989
- Amblyseius subtilidentis Karg, 1993
- Amblyseius sumatrensis Ehara, 2002
- Amblyseius sundi Pritchard & Baker, 1962
- Amblyseius supercaudatus Karg, 1994
- Amblyseius swellendamensis Ueckermann & Loots, 1988
- Amblyseius swirskii Athias-Henriot, 1962
- Amblyseius sylvestris Denmark & Muma, 1989

=== T ===
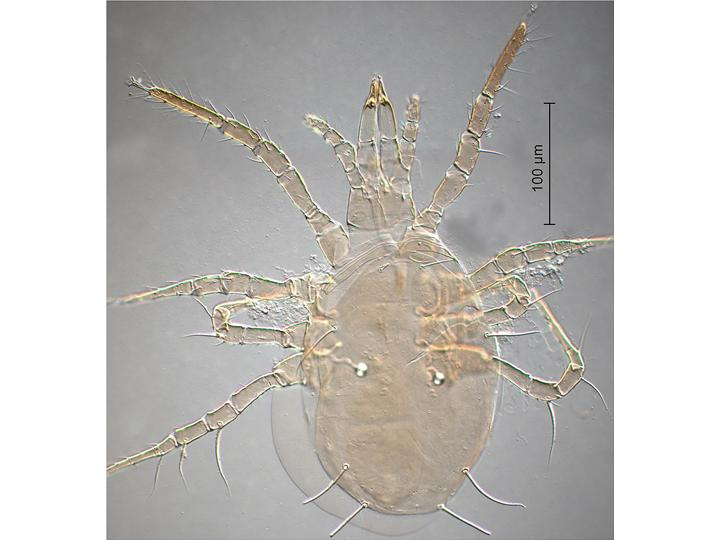
Amblyseius tamatavensis

- Amblyseius tamatavensis Blommers, 1974
- Amblyseius tee Schicha, 1983
- Amblyseius tenuis Wu & Ou, 2001
- Amblyseius tianmuensis Liang & Lao, 1994
- Amblyseius triangulus Wu, Lan & Zeng, 1997
- Amblyseius trisetosus Tseng, 1983
- Amblyseius tsugawai Ehara, 1959
- Amblyseius tubae Karg, 1970
- Amblyseius tuscus Berlese, 1914

=== U ===
- Amblyseius utricularius Karg, 1994
- Amblyseius utriculus Karg, 1989

=== V ===
- Amblyseius valpoensis Gonzalez & Schuster, 1962
- Amblyseius vasiformis Moraes & Mesa, in Moraes, Mesa & Braun 1991
- Amblyseius verginensis Papadoulis, 1995
- Amblyseius volcanus Prasad, 1968

=== W ===
- Amblyseius waltersi Schicha, 1981
- Amblyseius wangi (Yin, Bei & Lu, 1992)
- Amblyseius wanka Schicha & Corpuz-Raros, 1992
- Amblyseius williamsi Schicha, 1983
- Amblyseius wuyiensis Wu & Li, 1983

=== Y ===
- Amblyseius yadongensis Wu, 1987

=== Z ===
- Amblyseius zaheri Yousef & El-Brollosy, in Zaher 1986
