= Amblyseius oatmani =

Scientific classification
- Kingdom: Animalia
- Phylum: Arthropoda
- Subphylum: Chelicerata
- Class: Arachnida
- Order: Mesostigmata
- Family: Phytoseiidae
- Genus: Amblyseius
- Species: A. oatmani

Binomial name
- Amblyseius oatmani (Denmark, 1974)

Species of mites

Amblyseius oatmani is a species of mites in the Phytoseiidae family. It was described by Denmark in 1974.
