= Amblyseius angulatus =

Scientific classification
- Domain: Eukaryota
- Kingdom: Animalia
- Phylum: Arthropoda
- Subphylum: Chelicerata
- Class: Arachnida
- Order: Mesostigmata
- Family: Phytoseiidae
- Genus: Amblyseius
- Species: A. angulatus

Binomial name
- Amblyseius angulatus (Karg, 1982)

Species of mite

Amblyseius angulatus is a species of mite in the Phytoseiidae family. It was described by Karg in 1982
