= Amblyseius obtuserellus =

Scientific classification
- Kingdom: Animalia
- Phylum: Arthropoda
- Subphylum: Chelicerata
- Class: Arachnida
- Order: Mesostigmata
- Family: Phytoseiidae
- Genus: Amblyseius
- Species: A. obtuserellus

Binomial name
- Amblyseius obtuserellus Wainstein & Beglyarov, 1971

Species of mite

Amblyseius obtuserellus is a species of mite in the family Phytoseiidae.
