= Amblyseius genualis =

Scientific classification
- Kingdom: Animalia
- Phylum: Arthropoda
- Subphylum: Chelicerata
- Class: Arachnida
- Order: Mesostigmata
- Family: Phytoseiidae
- Genus: Amblyseius
- Species: A. genualis

Binomial name
- Amblyseius genualis De Leon, 1967

Species of mite

Amblyseius genualis is a species of mite in the family Phytoseiidae.
