= Amblyseius silvaticus =

Scientific classification
- Kingdom: Animalia
- Phylum: Arthropoda
- Subphylum: Chelicerata
- Class: Arachnida
- Order: Mesostigmata
- Family: Phytoseiidae
- Genus: Amblyseius
- Species: A. silvaticus

Binomial name
- Amblyseius silvaticus (Chant, 1959)

Species of mite

Amblyseius silvaticus is a species of mite in the family Phytoseiidae. It is found in Europe.
