= Amblyseius herbicoloides =

Scientific classification
- Kingdom: Animalia
- Phylum: Arthropoda
- Subphylum: Chelicerata
- Class: Arachnida
- Order: Mesostigmata
- Family: Phytoseiidae
- Genus: Amblyseius
- Species: A. herbicoloides

Binomial name
- Amblyseius herbicoloides McMurtry & Moraes, 1984

Species of mite

Amblyseius herbicoloides is a species of mite in the family Phytoseiidae.
