= Amblyseius kokufuensis =

Scientific classification
- Kingdom: Animalia
- Phylum: Arthropoda
- Subphylum: Chelicerata
- Class: Arachnida
- Order: Mesostigmata
- Family: Phytoseiidae
- Genus: Amblyseius
- Species: A. kokufuensis

Binomial name
- Amblyseius kokufuensis Ehara & Kato, 1994

Species of mite

Amblyseius kokufuensis is a species of mite belonging to the genus Amblyseius in the family Phytoseiidae.
