= Amblyseius intermedius =

Scientific classification
- Kingdom: Animalia
- Phylum: Arthropoda
- Subphylum: Chelicerata
- Class: Arachnida
- Order: Mesostigmata
- Family: Phytoseiidae
- Genus: Amblyseius
- Species: A. intermedius

Binomial name
- Amblyseius intermedius Gonzalez & Schuster, 1962

Species of mite

Amblyseius intermedius is a species of mite in the family Phytoseiidae.
