= Amblyseius calidum =

Scientific classification
- Kingdom: Animalia
- Phylum: Arthropoda
- Subphylum: Chelicerata
- Class: Arachnida
- Order: Mesostigmata
- Family: Phytoseiidae
- Genus: Amblyseius
- Species: A. calidum

Binomial name
- Amblyseius calidum Khan, Afzal & Akbar, 2000

Species of mite

Amblyseius calidum is a species of mite in the family Phytoseiidae.
