= Amblyseius multidentatus =

Scientific classification
- Kingdom: Animalia
- Phylum: Arthropoda
- Subphylum: Chelicerata
- Class: Arachnida
- Order: Mesostigmata
- Family: Phytoseiidae
- Genus: Amblyseius
- Species: A. multidentatus

Binomial name
- Amblyseius multidentatus (Chant, 1959)

Species of mite

Amblyseius multidentatus is a species of mite in the family Phytoseiidae.
