= Amblyseius longisaccatus =

Scientific classification
- Kingdom: Animalia
- Phylum: Arthropoda
- Subphylum: Chelicerata
- Class: Arachnida
- Order: Mesostigmata
- Family: Phytoseiidae
- Genus: Amblyseius
- Species: A. longisaccatus

Binomial name
- Amblyseius longisaccatus Wu, Lan & Liu, 1995

Species of mite

Amblyseius longisaccatus is a species of mite in the family Phytoseiidae.
