= Amblyseius adjaricus =

Scientific classification
- Kingdom: Animalia
- Phylum: Arthropoda
- Subphylum: Chelicerata
- Class: Arachnida
- Order: Mesostigmata
- Family: Phytoseiidae
- Genus: Amblyseius
- Species: A. adjaricus

Binomial name
- Amblyseius adjaricus Wainstein & Vartapetov, 1972

Species of mite

Amblyseius adjaricus is a species of mite in the family Phytoseiidae.
