= Amblyseius tianmuensis =

Scientific classification
- Kingdom: Animalia
- Phylum: Arthropoda
- Subphylum: Chelicerata
- Class: Arachnida
- Order: Mesostigmata
- Family: Phytoseiidae
- Genus: Amblyseius
- Species: A. tianmuensis

Binomial name
- Amblyseius tianmuensis Liang & Lao, 1994

Species of mite

Amblyseius tianmuensis is a species of mite in the family Phytoseiidae.
