= Amblyseius daliensis =

Scientific classification
- Kingdom: Animalia
- Phylum: Arthropoda
- Subphylum: Chelicerata
- Class: Arachnida
- Order: Mesostigmata
- Family: Phytoseiidae
- Genus: Amblyseius
- Species: A. daliensis

Binomial name
- Amblyseius daliensis K.e.Liang, 1984

Species of mite

Amblyseius daliensis is a species of mite in the family Phytoseiidae.
