= Amblyseius wangi =

Scientific classification
- Kingdom: Animalia
- Phylum: Arthropoda
- Subphylum: Chelicerata
- Class: Arachnida
- Order: Mesostigmata
- Family: Phytoseiidae
- Genus: Amblyseius
- Species: A. wangi

Binomial name
- Amblyseius wangi (Yin, Bei & Lu, 1992)

Species of mite

Amblyseius wangi is a species of mite in the family Phytoseiidae.
