= Amblyseius bellatulus =

Scientific classification
- Domain: Eukaryota
- Kingdom: Animalia
- Phylum: Arthropoda
- Subphylum: Chelicerata
- Class: Arachnida
- Order: Mesostigmata
- Family: Phytoseiidae
- Genus: Amblyseius
- Species: A. bellatulus

Binomial name
- Amblyseius bellatulus (Tseng, 1983)

Species of mite

Amblyseius bellatulus is a species of mite in the Phytoseiidae family that is native to Taiwan. It was described by Tseng Yi-Hsiung in 1983. Following his retirement, Tseng's collection of more than 20 holotypes of Taiwanese phytoseiid fauna were lost. A. Bellatulus re-described in 2017 by a team from National Taiwan University led by Liao Jhih-Rong, who collected new specimens of phytoseiid mites from the original locale used by Tseng as well as other areas throughout Taiwan.
