= Amblyseius sundi =

Scientific classification
- Kingdom: Animalia
- Phylum: Arthropoda
- Subphylum: Chelicerata
- Class: Arachnida
- Order: Mesostigmata
- Family: Phytoseiidae
- Genus: Amblyseius
- Species: A. sundi

Binomial name
- Amblyseius sundi Pritchard & Baker, 1962

Species of mite

Amblyseius sundi is a species of mite in the family Phytoseiidae. It has only been observed to inhabit Guadalupe.
