= Amblyseius tsugawai =

Scientific classification
- Kingdom: Animalia
- Phylum: Arthropoda
- Subphylum: Chelicerata
- Class: Arachnida
- Order: Mesostigmata
- Family: Phytoseiidae
- Genus: Amblyseius
- Species: A. tsugawai

Binomial name
- Amblyseius tsugawai Ehara, 1959

Species of mite

Amblyseius tsugawai is a species of predatory mite belonging to the family Phytoseiidae. This oval mite, less than 0.5 mm in length, is only known from apple trees on Honshū, Japan. It is very similar to congeners found outside Japan but can be distinguished by details of the setation on the fourth pair of legs.
