= Amblyseius parakaguya =

Scientific classification
- Kingdom: Animalia
- Phylum: Arthropoda
- Subphylum: Chelicerata
- Class: Arachnida
- Order: Mesostigmata
- Family: Phytoseiidae
- Genus: Amblyseius
- Species: A. parakaguya

Binomial name
- Amblyseius parakaguya Denmark & Edland, 2002

Species of mite

Amblyseius parakaguya is a species of mite in the family Phytoseiidae. It is found in Europe.
