= Amblyseius leonardi =

Scientific classification
- Kingdom: Animalia
- Phylum: Arthropoda
- Subphylum: Chelicerata
- Class: Arachnida
- Order: Mesostigmata
- Family: Phytoseiidae
- Genus: Amblyseius
- Species: A. leonardi

Binomial name
- Amblyseius leonardi McMurtry & Moraes, 1989

Species of mite

Amblyseius leonardi is a species of mite in the family Phytoseiidae.
