= Amblyseius paucisetis =

Scientific classification
- Kingdom: Animalia
- Phylum: Arthropoda
- Subphylum: Chelicerata
- Class: Arachnida
- Order: Mesostigmata
- Family: Phytoseiidae
- Genus: Amblyseius
- Species: A. paucisetis

Binomial name
- Amblyseius paucisetis Wainstein, 1983

Species of mite

Amblyseius paucisetis is a species of mite in the family Phytoseiidae.
