= Amblyseius cupulus =

Scientific classification
- Kingdom: Animalia
- Phylum: Arthropoda
- Subphylum: Chelicerata
- Class: Arachnida
- Order: Mesostigmata
- Family: Phytoseiidae
- Genus: Amblyseius
- Species: A. cupulus

Binomial name
- Amblyseius cupulus Denmark & Muma, 1989

Species of mite

Amblyseius cupulus is a species of mite in the family Phytoseiidae.
