= Amblyseius neoperditus =

Scientific classification
- Kingdom: Animalia
- Phylum: Arthropoda
- Subphylum: Chelicerata
- Class: Arachnida
- Order: Mesostigmata
- Family: Phytoseiidae
- Genus: Amblyseius
- Species: A. neoperditus

Binomial name
- Amblyseius neoperditus Moraes & Mesa, 1991

Species of mite

Amblyseius neoperditus is a species of mite in the family Phytoseiidae.
