= Amblyseius celsus =

Scientific classification
- Kingdom: Animalia
- Phylum: Arthropoda
- Subphylum: Chelicerata
- Class: Arachnida
- Order: Mesostigmata
- Family: Phytoseiidae
- Genus: Amblyseius
- Species: A. celsus

Binomial name
- Amblyseius celsus Khan, Khan & Akbar, 1997

Species of mite

Amblyseius celsus is a species of mite in the family Phytoseiidae. It was described by A.S. Khan, M.R. Khan, and S. Akbar in 1997, together with four other Amblyseius species. It is known from Pakistan.
