= Amblyseius brevicervix =

Scientific classification
- Kingdom: Animalia
- Phylum: Arthropoda
- Subphylum: Chelicerata
- Class: Arachnida
- Order: Mesostigmata
- Family: Phytoseiidae
- Genus: Amblyseius
- Species: A. brevicervix

Binomial name
- Amblyseius brevicervix Wu & Li, 1985

Species of mite

Amblyseius brevicervix is a species of mite in the family Phytoseiidae.
