= Amblyseius nicola =

Scientific classification
- Domain: Eukaryota
- Kingdom: Animalia
- Phylum: Arthropoda
- Subphylum: Chelicerata
- Class: Arachnida
- Order: Mesostigmata
- Family: Phytoseiidae
- Genus: Amblyseius
- Species: A. nicola

Binomial name
- Amblyseius nicola (Chant & Hansell, 1971)

Species of mite

Amblyseius nicola is a species of mite in the Phytoseiidae family. It was described by Chant and Hansell in 1971.
