= Amblyseius ankaratrae =

Scientific classification
- Domain: Eukaryota
- Kingdom: Animalia
- Phylum: Arthropoda
- Subphylum: Chelicerata
- Class: Arachnida
- Order: Mesostigmata
- Family: Phytoseiidae
- Genus: Amblyseius
- Species: A. ankaratrae

Binomial name
- Amblyseius ankaratrae (Blommers, 1976)

Species of mite

Amblyseius ankaratrae is a species of mite in the Phytoseiidae family. It was described by Blomners in 1976.
