= Amblyseius begljarovi =

Scientific classification
- Domain: Eukaryota
- Kingdom: Animalia
- Phylum: Arthropoda
- Subphylum: Chelicerata
- Class: Arachnida
- Order: Mesostigmata
- Family: Phytoseiidae
- Genus: Amblyseius
- Species: A. begljarovi

Binomial name
- Amblyseius begljarovi (Abbasova, 1970)

Species of mite

Amblyseius begljarovi is a species of mite in the Phytoseiidae family. It was described by Abbasova in 1970.
