= Amblyseius neobernhardi =

Scientific classification
- Kingdom: Animalia
- Phylum: Arthropoda
- Subphylum: Chelicerata
- Class: Arachnida
- Order: Mesostigmata
- Family: Phytoseiidae
- Genus: Amblyseius
- Species: A. neobernhardi

Binomial name
- Amblyseius neobernhardi Athias-Henriot, 1966

Species of mite

Amblyseius neobernhardi is a species of mite in the family Phytoseiidae.
