= Paraphytoseius =

Scientific classification
- Kingdom: Animalia
- Phylum: Arthropoda
- Subphylum: Chelicerata
- Class: Arachnida
- Order: Mesostigmata
- Family: Phytoseiidae
- Genus: Paraphytoseius; Swirski & Shechter, 1961

Genus of mites

Paraphytoseius is a genus of mites in the Phytoseiidae family.

== Species ==
- Paraphytoseius bhadrakaliensis (Gupta, 1969)
- Paraphytoseius chihpenensis Ho & Lo, 1989
- Paraphytoseius cracentis (Corpuz & Rimando, 1966)
- Paraphytoseius hilli Beard & Walter, 1996
- Paraphytoseius horrifer (Pritchard & Baker, 1962)
- Paraphytoseius hualienensis Ho & Lo, 1989
- Paraphytoseius hyalinus (Tseng, 1973)
- Paraphytoseius nicobarensis (Gupta, 1977)
- Paraphytoseius orientalis (Narayanan, Kaur & Ghai, 1960)
- Paraphytoseius parabilis (Chaudhri, 1967)
- Paraphytoseius santurcensis De Leon, 1965
- Paraphytoseius scleroticus (Gupta & Ray, 1981)
- Paraphytoseius seychellensis Schicha & Corpuz-Raros, 1985
- Paraphytoseius subtropicus (Tseng, 1972)
- Paraphytoseius urumanus (Ehara, 1967)
