= Amblyseius yadongensis =

Scientific classification
- Kingdom: Animalia
- Phylum: Arthropoda
- Subphylum: Chelicerata
- Class: Arachnida
- Order: Mesostigmata
- Family: Phytoseiidae
- Genus: Amblyseius
- Species: A. yadongensis

Binomial name
- Amblyseius yadongensis Wu, 1987

Species of mite

Amblyseius yadongensis is a species of mite in the family Phytoseiidae.
