= Amblyseius crowleyi =

Scientific classification
- Kingdom: Animalia
- Phylum: Arthropoda
- Subphylum: Chelicerata
- Class: Arachnida
- Order: Mesostigmata
- Family: Phytoseiidae
- Genus: Amblyseius
- Species: A. crowleyi

Binomial name
- Amblyseius crowleyi Congdon, 2002

Species of mite

Amblyseius crowleyi is a species of mite in the family Phytoseiidae.
