= Amblyseius microorientalis =

Scientific classification
- Kingdom: Animalia
- Phylum: Arthropoda
- Subphylum: Chelicerata
- Class: Arachnida
- Order: Mesostigmata
- Family: Phytoseiidae
- Genus: Amblyseius
- Species: A. microorientalis

Binomial name
- Amblyseius microorientalis Wainstein & Beglyarov, 1971

Species of mite

Amblyseius microorientalis is a species of mite belonging to the genus Amblyseius in the family Phytoseiidae.

== Distribution ==
A. microorientalis was described during a survey of Phytoseiidae species in Slovenia. The species is observed to have an exceptionally wide distribution, with specimens also being found in the Ruyuan Yao Autonomous County of China.

== Description ==
The first description of the species concerned a female specimen uncovered in 1971. A male of the species was not described until 2020.

== Behavior ==
Like other members of its family, A. microorientalis is a predatory mite. Keeping with this categorization, the species has been observed feeding on other mite species, particularly the widely distributed Tetranychus urticae.
