= Amblyseius fernandezi =

Scientific classification
- Kingdom: Animalia
- Phylum: Arthropoda
- Subphylum: Chelicerata
- Class: Arachnida
- Order: Mesostigmata
- Family: Phytoseiidae
- Genus: Amblyseius
- Species: A. fernandezi

Binomial name
- Amblyseius fernandezi Chant & Baker, 1965

Species of mite

Amblyseius fernandezi is a species of mite in the family Phytoseiidae.
