= Amblyseius alpinia =

Scientific classification
- Kingdom: Animalia
- Phylum: Arthropoda
- Subphylum: Chelicerata
- Class: Arachnida
- Order: Mesostigmata
- Family: Phytoseiidae
- Genus: Amblyseius
- Species: A. alpinia

Binomial name
- Amblyseius alpinia Tseng, 1983

Species of mite

Amblyseius alpinia is a species of mite in the Phytoseiidae family. It is endemic to Taiwan.
