= Amblyseius chanioticus =

Scientific classification
- Kingdom: Animalia
- Phylum: Arthropoda
- Subphylum: Chelicerata
- Class: Arachnida
- Order: Mesostigmata
- Family: Phytoseiidae
- Genus: Amblyseius
- Species: A. chanioticus

Binomial name
- Amblyseius chanioticus Papadoulis, 1997

Species of mite

Amblyseius chanioticus is a species of mite in the family Phytoseiidae.
