= Amblyseius animos =

Scientific classification
- Domain: Eukaryota
- Kingdom: Animalia
- Phylum: Arthropoda
- Subphylum: Chelicerata
- Class: Arachnida
- Order: Mesostigmata
- Family: Phytoseiidae
- Genus: Amblyseius
- Species: A. animos

Binomial name
- Amblyseius animos (Khan, Afzal & Akbar, 2000)

Species of arachnid

Amblyseius animos is a species of mite in the Phytoseiidae family known from Pakistan. It was described by A.S. Khan, M. Afzal and Shamshad Akbar in 2000.
