= Paraphytoseius horrifer =

Scientific classification
- Domain: Eukaryota
- Kingdom: Animalia
- Phylum: Arthropoda
- Subphylum: Chelicerata
- Class: Arachnida
- Order: Mesostigmata
- Family: Phytoseiidae
- Genus: Paraphytoseius
- Species: P. horrifer

Binomial name
- Paraphytoseius horrifer (Pritchard & Baker, 1962)

Species of mite

Paraphytoseius horrifer is a species of mite in the family Phytoseiidae.
