= Amblyseius ampullosus =

Scientific classification
- Kingdom: Animalia
- Phylum: Arthropoda
- Subphylum: Chelicerata
- Class: Arachnida
- Order: Mesostigmata
- Family: Phytoseiidae
- Genus: Amblyseius
- Species: A. ampullosus

Binomial name
- Amblyseius ampullosus Wu & Lan, 1991

Species of mite

Amblyseius ampullosus is a species of mite in the family Phytoseiidae.
