= Amblyseius juliae =

Scientific classification
- Kingdom: Animalia
- Phylum: Arthropoda
- Subphylum: Chelicerata
- Class: Arachnida
- Order: Mesostigmata
- Family: Phytoseiidae
- Genus: Amblyseius
- Species: A. juliae

Binomial name
- Amblyseius juliae Schicha, 1983

Species of mite

Amblyseius juliae is a species of mite in the family Phytoseiidae.
