= Amblyseius punctatus =

Scientific classification
- Kingdom: Animalia
- Phylum: Arthropoda
- Subphylum: Chelicerata
- Class: Arachnida
- Order: Mesostigmata
- Family: Phytoseiidae
- Genus: Amblyseius
- Species: A. punctatus

Binomial name
- Amblyseius punctatus Muma, Metz & Farrier, 1967

Species of mite

Amblyseius punctatus is a species of mite in the family Phytoseiidae.
