= Amblyseius januaricus =

Scientific classification
- Kingdom: Animalia
- Phylum: Arthropoda
- Subphylum: Chelicerata
- Class: Arachnida
- Order: Mesostigmata
- Family: Phytoseiidae
- Genus: Amblyseius
- Species: A. januaricus

Binomial name
- Amblyseius januaricus Wainstein & Vartapetov, 1972

Species of mite

Amblyseius januaricus is a species of mite belonging to the genus Amblyseius in the family Phytoseiidae. It is found in Europe.
