= Amblyseius mcmurtryi =

Scientific classification
- Kingdom: Animalia
- Phylum: Arthropoda
- Subphylum: Chelicerata
- Class: Arachnida
- Order: Mesostigmata
- Family: Phytoseiidae
- Genus: Amblyseius
- Species: A. mcmurtryi

Binomial name
- Amblyseius mcmurtryi Muma, 1967

Species of mite

Amblyseius mcmurtryi is a species of mite in the family Phytoseiidae. Amblyseius mcmurtryi is a species of arachnid described by Muma in 1967. Amblyseius mcmurtryi is a member of the genus Amblyseius and the family Phytoseiidae. No subspecies are listed in the Catalogue of Life. Amblyseius mcmurtryi (Lat. Amblyseius mcmurtryi) is a species of animal in the genus Amblyseius, family Phytoseiidae, order Mesostigmata, class Arachnida, phylum Aothropoda.
