= Amblyseius acalyphus =

Scientific classification
- Kingdom: Animalia
- Phylum: Arthropoda
- Subphylum: Chelicerata
- Class: Arachnida
- Order: Mesostigmata
- Family: Phytoseiidae
- Genus: Amblyseius
- Species: A. acalyphus

Binomial name
- Amblyseius acalyphus Denmark & Muma, 1973

Species of mite

Amblyseius acalyphus is a species of mite in the family Phytoseiidae. It has been found in areas of Brazil, Martinique, and Guadeloupe.
