= Amblyseius orientalis =

Scientific classification
- Kingdom: Animalia
- Phylum: Arthropoda
- Subphylum: Chelicerata
- Class: Arachnida
- Order: Mesostigmata
- Family: Phytoseiidae
- Genus: Amblyseius
- Species: A. orientalis

Binomial name
- Amblyseius orientalis Ehara, 1959

Species of mite

Amblyseius orientalis is a species of predatory mite belonging to the family Phytoseiidae. This oval, greyish white mite is very small; the female is around 380 μm in length and the male is even smaller at around 280 μm. Both sexes are notable for the very long setae on the margins of the body and on the fourth pair of legs. As with many of these often confusingly similar mites, the shape of the sclerotized body shields is important in identification.

This species is found on various trees and shrubs on Hokkaidō, Japan.
