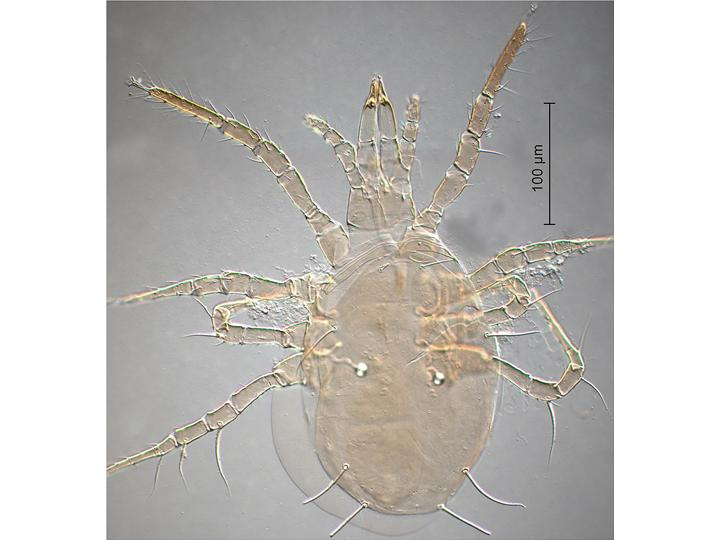
- Amblyseius tamatavensis

Scientific classification
- Kingdom: Animalia
- Phylum: Arthropoda
- Subphylum: Chelicerata
- Class: Arachnida
- Order: Mesostigmata
- Family: Phytoseiidae
- Genus: Amblyseius
- Species: A. tamatavensis

Binomial name
- Amblyseius tamatavensis Blommers, 1974

= Amblyseius tamatavensis =

Species of mite

Amblyseius tamatavensis is a species of mite in the family Phytoseiidae.
