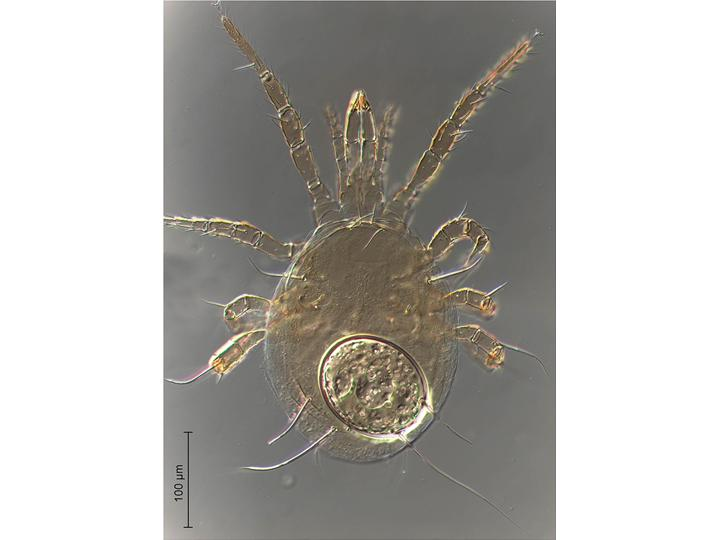

Scientific classification
- Kingdom: Animalia
- Phylum: Arthropoda
- Subphylum: Chelicerata
- Class: Arachnida
- Order: Mesostigmata
- Family: Phytoseiidae
- Genus: Amblyseius
- Species: A. largoensis

Binomial name
- Amblyseius largoensis (Muma, 1955)

Synonyms
- Amblyseius amtalaensis Gupta, 1977; Amblyseius sakalava Blommers, 1976; Typhlodromus largoensis Muma, 1955

= Amblyseius largoensis =

Species of mite

Amblyseius largoensis is a species of mite in the family Phytoseiidae. It is found in Europe. It is known to feed on Raoiella indica eggs. A. largoensis completes its immature stage in less than a week.
