= Wolfgang Karg =

East German acaralogist (mite specialist) and entomologist

- Born: 10 July 1927; Gröningen
- Died: 4 August 2016 (aged 89)
- Alma mater: Humboldt University of Berlin
- Occupation: Acarologist, scientist, entomologist, zoological collector
- Employer: Bundesanstalt für Züchtungsforschung (1956–)

Wolfgang Siegfried Karg (1927–2016) was an East German entomologist who specialised in mites (Acari).

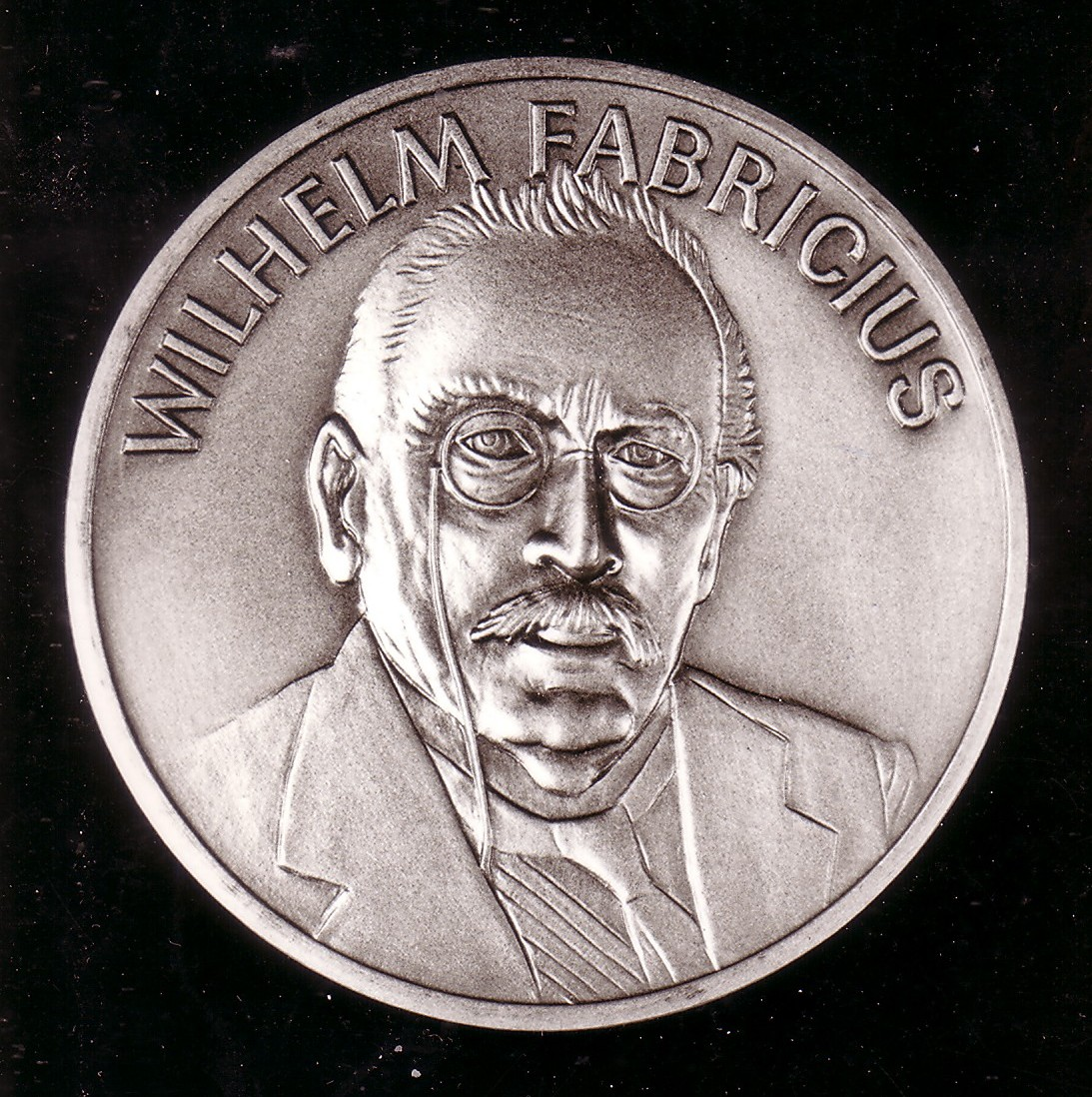
Fabricius Medal

Following captivity in World War II he completed high school and teacher training, and then taught in high schools from 1948 to 1950 in Groß-Alsleben, Sachsen-Anhalt, in what was then East Germany.

He received his doctorate in 1960 from Humboldt University in Berlin and completed his habilitation in 1965 with a thesis on phylogeny of predatory mites.

From 1956 he worked at the Biological Research Centre in Berlin. In 1990 he was appointed professor.

He worked on the effect of pesticides on microarthropods in various ecosystems; predatoy mites in agronomy; and the systematics and phylogeny of Mesostigmata, and was awarded the Fabricius medal in 1993 by the Deutsche Gesellschaft für Allgemeine und Angewandte Entomologie (German entomology society).

== Species ==
=== Species named and described by Karg ===
Over 800 taxa were named and described by Karg. See also Taxa named by Wolfgang Karg.

=== Species named to honour Karg ===
- Alliphis kargi Arutunian, 1991
- Cheiroseius kargi Gwiazdowicz, 2002
- Cyrthydrolaelaps kargi Hirschmann, 1966
- Dendrolaelaps kargi Hirschmann, 1966
- Epicrius kargi Solomon, 1978
- Evimirus kargi Hirschmann, 1975
- Hypoaspis kargi Costa, 1968
- Iphidozercon kargi Hirschmann, 1966
- Lasioseius kargi Kandil, 1980
- Lasioseius kargi Christian, 1990
- Thinoseius kargi Hirschmann, 1966
- Uropoda kargi Hirschmann & Zirngiebl-Nicol, 1969

== Some publications ==
- W. Karg; V. Huhta (December 2014). "Typhlodromips jurmoensis (Acari: Mesostigmata: Amblyseiinae), a new species from the archipelago of SW Finland". Arthropoda Selecta. 23 (1): 189193–0. doi:10.15298/ARTHSEL.23.2.07. ISSN 0136-006X. Wikidata Q109746559.
- Wolfgang Karg; Anita Schorlemmer (September 2011). "The predatory mite family Ologamasidae Ryke, 1962 and its position within the higher groups of Parasitiformes (Acarina) with new species from South America". Mitteilungen aus dem Museum für Naturkunde in Berlin. Zoologische Reihe. 87 (2): 205–219. doi:10.1002/ZOOS.201100003. ISSN 1435-1935. Wikidata Q99654797.
- Wolfgang Karg; Anita Schorlemmer (September 2013). "Origin of five unique Mite-Genera in geological periods compared to other groups of Gamasina (Acarina, Parasitiformes) and description of two new species ofRykellusLee andOloopticusKarg". Mitteilungen aus dem Museum für Naturkunde in Berlin. Zoologische Reihe. 89 (2): 193–207. doi:10.1002/ZOOS.201300006. ISSN 1435-1935. Wikidata Q101571856.
- Wolfgang Karg; Anita Schorlemmer (17 March 2009). "New insights into predatory mites (Acarina, Gamasina) from tropical rain forests with special reference to distribution and taxonomy". Mitteilungen aus dem Museum für Naturkunde in Berlin. Zoologische Reihe. 85 (1): 57–91. doi:10.1002/ZOOS.200800016. ISSN 1435-1935. Wikidata Q99641111.
