= List of Phytoseiidae species =

This is a list of the described species of the mite family Phytoseiidae. The data is taken from Joel Hallan's Biology Catalog.

== Amblyseiinae ==
Amblyseiinae Muma, 1961

- Amblyseiella Muma, 1955

- Amblyseiella denmarki (Zaher & El-Brollosy, 1986)
- Amblyseiella rusticana (Athias-Henriot, 1960) — setosa?
- Amblyseiella setosa Muma, 1955

- Amblyseiulella Muma, 1961

- Amblyseiulella amanoi Ehara, in Ehara, Okada & Kato 1994
- Amblyseiulella baltazarae Corpuz-Raros, 1995
- Amblyseiulella chombongenis Ryu & Lee, 1995
- Amblyseiulella domatorum (Schicha, 1993)
- Amblyseiulella gapudi Corpuz-Raros, 1995
- Amblyseiulella heveae (Oudemans, 1930)
- Amblyseiulella hyauliangensis (Gupta, 1986)
- Amblyseiulella nucifera (Gupta, 1979)
- Amblyseiulella odowdi Ryu & Lee, 1995
- Amblyseiulella omei (Wu & Li, 1984)
- Amblyseiulella paraheveae (Wu & Ou, 2002)
- Amblyseiulella prunii (Liang & Ke, 1982)
- Amblyseiulella thoi Ehara, 2002
- Amblyseiulella xizangensis (Wu, 1997)
- Amblyseiulella yaeyamana Ehara & Amano, 2002

- Amblyseius Berlese, 1914

- Amblyseius abbasovae Wainstein & Beglyarov, 1971
- Amblyseius acalyphus Denmark & Muma, 1973
- Amblyseius adhatodae Muma, 1967
- Amblyseius adjaricus Wainstein & Vartapetov, 1972
- Amblyseius aequipilus Berlese, 1914
- Amblyseius aerialis (Muma, 1955)
- Amblyseius alpigenus Wu, 1987
- Amblyseius alpinia Tseng, 1983
- Amblyseius americanus Garman, 1948
- Amblyseius ampullosus Wu & Lan, 1991
- Amblyseius anacardii De Leon, 1967
- Amblyseius andersoni (Chant, 1957)
- Amblyseius angulatus Karg, 1982
- Amblyseius animos Khan, Afzal & Akbar, 2000
- Amblyseius ankaratrae Blommers, 1976
- Amblyseius anomalus van der Merwe, 1968
- Amblyseius araraticus Arutunjan & Ohandjanian, 1972
- Amblyseius aricae Karg, 1976
- Amblyseius armeniacus Arutunjan & Ohandjanian, 1972
- Amblyseius asperocervix McMurtry & Moraes, 1985
- Amblyseius bahiensis Lofego, Moraes & McMurtry, 2000
- Amblyseius bayonicus Athias-Henriot, 1966
- Amblyseius begljarovi Abbasova, 1970
- Amblyseius bellatulus Tseng, 1983
- Amblyseius bidens Karg, 1970
- Amblyseius bidibidi (Collyer, 1964)
- Amblyseius boina Blommers, 1976
- Amblyseius brevicervix Wu & Li, 1985
- Amblyseius bufortus Ueckermann & Loots, 1988
- Amblyseius bulga Khan, Khan & Akbar, 1997
- Amblyseius calidum Khan, Afzal & Akbar, 2000
- Amblyseius carnis Khan, Khan & Akbar, 1997
- Amblyseius caspiansis (Denmark & Daneshvar, 1982)
- Amblyseius caudatus Berlese, 1914
- Amblyseius caviphilus Karg, 1986
- Amblyseius celsus Khan, Khan & Akbar, 1997
- Amblyseius cessator De Leon, 1962
- Amblyseius changbaiensis Wu, 1987
- Amblyseius chanioticus Papadoulis, 1997
- Amblyseius channabasavannai Gupta & Daniel, in Gupta 1978
- Amblyseius chiapensis De Leon, 1961
- Amblyseius chilcotti Chant & Hansell, 1971
- Amblyseius chorites Schuster & Pritchard, 1963
- Amblyseius chungas Denmark & Muma, 1989
- Amblyseius cinctus Corpuz-Raros & Rimando, 1966
- Amblyseius circumflexis De Leon, 1966
- Amblyseius coffeae De Leon, 1961
- Amblyseius colimensis Aponte & McMurtry, 1987
- Amblyseius collaris Karg, 1983
- Amblyseius comatus Ueckermann & Loots, 1988
- Amblyseius compositus Denmark & Muma, 1973
- Amblyseius corderoi Chant & Baker, 1965
- Amblyseius crassicaudalis Karg, 1998
- Amblyseius crowleyi Congdon, 2002
- Amblyseius cucurbitae Rather, 1985
- Amblyseius cupulus Denmark & Muma, 1989
- Amblyseius curiosus (Chant & Baker, 1965)
- Amblyseius curticervicalis Moraes & Mesa, in Moraes, Mesa & Braun 1991
- Amblyseius cydonus Ueckermann & Loots, 1988
- Amblyseius daliensis Liang & Ke, 1984
- Amblyseius deductus Chaudhri, Akbar & Rasool, 1979
- Amblyseius deleonellus Athias-Henriot, 1967
- Amblyseius denticulosus (Hirschmann, 1962)
- Amblyseius divisus De Leon, 1961
- Amblyseius duncansoni Specht & Rasmy, 1970
- Amblyseius duplicesetus Moraes & McMurtry, 1988
- Amblyseius eharai Amitai & Swirski, 1981
- Amblyseius erlangensis (Hirschmann, 1962) — syn. of affatisetus = obtusus by Athias Henriot 1966 ?
- Amblyseius euanalis (Karg, 1983)
- Amblyseius euterpes Gondim Jr. & Moraes, 2001
- Amblyseius euvertex Karg, 1983
- Amblyseius excelsus Chaudhri, Akbar & Rasool, 1979
- Amblyseius faerroni Denmark & Evans, in Denmark, Evans, Aguilar, Vargas & Ochoa 1999
- Amblyseius fernandezi Chant & Baker, 1965
- Amblyseius fieldsi Denmark & Muma, 1989
- Amblyseius fijiensis McMurtry & Moraes, 1984
- Amblyseius filicinae Karg, 1998
- Amblyseius filixis Karg, 1970
- Amblyseius firmus Ehara, 1967
- Amblyseius fletcheri Schicha, 1981
- Amblyseius foenalis Berlese, 1914 — syn. of sellnicki Karg by Athias Henriot 1966 ?
- Amblyseius forfex Khan, Khan & Akbar, 1997
- Amblyseius franzellus Athias-Henriot, 1967
- Amblyseius fraterculus Berlese, 1916
- Amblyseius genualis De Leon, 1967
- Amblyseius geonomae Gondim Jr. & Moraes, 2001
- Amblyseius gliricidii De Leon, 1961
- Amblyseius gracilis (Garman, 1958)
- Amblyseius gramineous Wu, Lan & Zhang, 1992
- Amblyseius graminis Chant, 1956
- Amblyseius gruberi Denmark & Muma, 1989
- Amblyseius guianensis De Leon, 1966
- Amblyseius guntheri McMurtry & Schicha, 1987
- Amblyseius hainanensis Wu, in Wu & Qian 1983
- Amblyseius haleakalus Prasad, 1968
- Amblyseius hederae Denmark & Muma, 1989
- Amblyseius herbicoloides McMurtry & Moraes, 1984
- Amblyseius herbicolus (Chant, 1959)
- Amblyseius hexadens Karg, 1983
- Amblyseius humilis Khan, Khan & Akbar, 1997
- Amblyseius hurlbutti Denmark & Muma, 1989
- Amblyseius igarassuensis Gondim Jr. & Moraes, 2001
- Amblyseius impeltatus Denmark & Muma, 1973
- Amblyseius impressus Denmark & Muma, 1973
- Amblyseius incognitus Schuster, 1966
- Amblyseius indirae Gupta, 1985
- Amblyseius indocalami Zhu & Chen, 1983
- Amblyseius infundibulatus Athias-Henriot, 1961
- Amblyseius intermedius Gonzalez & Schuster, 1962
- Amblyseius invictus Schuster, 1966
- Amblyseius ipomoeae Ghai & Menon, 1967
- Amblyseius irinae Wainstein & Arutunjan, 1973
- Amblyseius ishizuchiensis Ehara, 1972
- Amblyseius isuki Chant & Hansel, 1971
- Amblyseius italicus (Chant, 1959)
- Amblyseius jailensis Kolodochka, 1981
- Amblyseius januaricus Wainstein & Vartapetov, 1973
- Amblyseius jilinensis Wu, 1987
- Amblyseius juliae Schicha, 1983
- Amblyseius kadii El-Halawany & Abdel-Samad, 1990
- Amblyseius kadzhajai Gomelauri, 1968
- Amblyseius kaguya Ehara, 1966
- Amblyseius kalandadzei Gomelauri, 1968
- Amblyseius keni Schicha, 1987
- Amblyseius kokufuensis Ehara & Kato, in Ehara, Okada & Kato 1994
- Amblyseius koreaensis Denmark & Muma, 1989
- Amblyseius koumacensis Schicha, 1981
- Amblyseius kulini Gupta, 1978
- Amblyseius largoensis (Muma, 1955)
- Amblyseius laselvius (Denmark & Evans, 1999)
- Amblyseius lassus Schuster, 1966
- Amblyseius lemani Tencalla & Mathys, 1958 — orig. genus Typhlodromus??
- Amblyseius lencus Denmark & Evans, in Denmark, Evans, Aguilar, Vargas & Ochoa 1999
- Amblyseius lentiginosus Denmark & Schicha, 1974
- Amblyseius leonardi McMurtry & Moraes, 1989
- Amblyseius lianshanus Zhu & Chen, 1980
- Amblyseius lituatus Athias-Henriot, 1961
- Amblyseius longicollis Denmark & Evans, in Denmark, Evans, Aguilar, Vargas & Ochoa 1999
- Amblyseius longimedius Wang & Xu, 1991
- Amblyseius longisaccatus Wu, Lan & Liu, 1995
- Amblyseius longulus Berlese, 1914
- Amblyseius lynnae McMurtry & Moraes, 1989
- Amblyseius mahabaeus Schicha & Corpuz-Raros, 1992
- Amblyseius magnoliae Muma, 1961
- Amblyseius malovi Beglyarov, 1981
- Amblyseius martini Collyer, 1982
- Amblyseius martus De Leon, 1966
- Amblyseius matinikus Schicha & Corpuz-Raros, 1992
- Amblyseius mazatlanus Denmark & Muma, 1989
- Amblyseius mcmurtryi Muma, 1967
- Amblyseius megaporos De Leon, 1961
- Amblyseius meghriensis Arutunjan, 1968
- Amblyseius meridionalis Berlese, 1914
- Amblyseius microorientalis Wainstein & Beglyarov, 1971
- Amblyseius modestus (Chant & Baker, 1965)
- Amblyseius monacus Wainstein, 1975
- Amblyseius morii Ehara, 1967
- Amblyseius mountus Ryu, 1995
- Amblyseius multidentatus (Chant, 1959)
- Amblyseius muraleedharani Gupta, 1986
- Amblyseius murteri Schweizer, 1961
- Amblyseius nahatius Schicha & Corpuz-Raros, 1992
- Amblyseius nambourensis Schicha, 1981
- Amblyseius nayaritensis De Leon, 1961
- Amblyseius nemorivagus Athias-Henriot, 1961
- Amblyseius neoankaratrae Ueckermann & Loots, 1988
- Amblyseius neobernhardi Athias-Henriot, 1966 — nomen nova
- Amblyseius neochiapensis Lofego, Moraes & McMurtry, 2000
- Amblyseius neocinctus Schicha & Corpuz-Raros, 1992
- Amblyseius neofijiensis Wu, Lan & Liu, 1995
- Amblyseius neofirmus Ehara & Okada, in Ehara, Okada & Kato 1994
- Amblyseius neolargoensis van der Merwe, 1965
- Amblyseius neolentiginosus Schicha, 1979
- Amblyseius neopascalis Wu & Ou, 2001
- Amblyseius neoperditus Moraes & Mesa, in Moraes, Mesa & Braun 1991
- Amblyseius neorykei Gupta, 1977
- Amblyseius newelli (Chant, 1960)
- Amblyseius nicola Chant & Hansell, 1971
- Amblyseius nonfraterculus Schicha, 1987
- Amblyseius oatmani Denmark, 1974
- Amblyseius obtuserellus Wainstein & Beglyarov, 1971
- Amblyseius obtusus (Koch, 1839)
- Amblyseius rhabdus Denmark, 1965
- Amblyseius ochii Ehara & Yokogawa, 1977
- Amblyseius omaloensis Gomelauri, 1968
- Amblyseius oocarpus (Denmark & Evans, 1999)
- Amblyseius operculatus De Leon, 1967
- Amblyseius orientalis Ehara, 1959
- Amblyseius ovalitectus van der Merwe, 1968
- Amblyseius pamperisi Papadoulis, 1997
- Amblyseius paraaerialis Muma, 1967
- Amblyseius parabufortus (Denmark & Evans, 1999)
- Amblyseius parakaguya Denmark & Edland, 2002
- Amblyseius parasundi Blommers, 1974
- Amblyseius pascalis Tseng, 1983
- Amblyseius passiflorae Blommers, 1974
- Amblyseius patellae Karg, 1982
- Amblyseius paucisetis Wainstein, 1983
- Amblyseius paucisetosus McMurtry & Moraes, 1985
- Amblyseius perditus Chant & Baker, 1965
- Amblyseius perlongisetus Berlese, 1916
- Amblyseius perplexus Denmark & Evans, in Denmark, Evans, Aguilar, Vargas & Ochoa 1999
- Amblyseius phillipsi McMurtry & Schicha, in McMurtry & Moraes 1984
- Amblyseius piracicabae (Denmark & Muma, 1973)
- Amblyseius polisensis Schicha & Corpuz-Raros, 1992
- Amblyseius pravus Denmark, 1977 — nomen nova
- Amblyseius pretoriaensis Ueckermann & Loots, 1988
- Amblyseius pritchardellus Athias-Henriot, 1967
- Amblyseius proresinae Karg, 1970
- Amblyseius punctatus Muma, Metz & Farrier, 1967
- Amblyseius pustulosus Karg, 1994
- Amblyseius quichua McMurtry & Moraes, 1989
- Amblyseius raoiellus Denmark & Muma, 1989
- Amblyseius readshawi Schicha, 1987
- Amblyseius riodocei El-Banhawy, 1984
- Amblyseius salinellus Athias-Henriot, 1966
- Amblyseius saltus (Zack, 1969)
- Amblyseius sangangensis Zhu & Chen, 1983
- Amblyseius santoensis Schicha, 1981
- Amblyseius saopaulus Denmark & Muma, 1973
- Amblyseius saurus De Leon, 1962
- Amblyseius schusteri (Chant, 1959)
- Amblyseius sculpticollis Denmark & Evans, in Denmark, Evans, Aguilar, Vargas & Ochoa 1999
- Amblyseius segregans De Leon, 1966
- Amblyseius sellnicki (Karg, 1960)
- Amblyseius serratus Karg, 1976
- Amblyseius shiganus Ehara, 1972
- Amblyseius siddiqui Khan & Chaudhri, 1969
- Amblyseius silvaticus (Chant, 1959)
- Amblyseius similicaudalis Karg, 1998
- Amblyseius similifloridanus (Hirschmann, 1962)
- Amblyseius similoides Buchellos & Pritchard, 1960
- Amblyseius sinuatus De Leon, 1961
- Amblyseius sinuatus Zhu & Chen, 1980 — praeoccupied De Leon 1961
- Amblyseius sobrinulus Athias-Henriot, 1967
- Amblyseius solani Ramos & Rodriguez, 1997
- Amblyseius solus Denmark & Matthysse, in Matthysse & Denmark 1981
- Amblyseius sorakensis Ryu, 1995
- Amblyseius sparsus Kolodochka, 1990
- Amblyseius spiculatus Denmark & Muma, 1973
- Amblyseius stramenti Karg, 1965
- Amblyseius strobocorycus Wu, Lan & Liu, 1995
- Amblyseius subpassiflorae Wu & Lan, 1989
- Amblyseius subtilidentis Karg, 1993
- Amblyseius sumatrensis Ehara, 2002
- Amblyseius sundi Pritchard & Baker, 1962
- Amblyseius supercaudatus Karg, 1994
- Amblyseius swellendamensis Ueckermann & Loots, 1988
- Amblyseius sylvestris Denmark & Muma, 1989
- Amblyseius tamatavensis Blommers, 1974
- Amblyseius tee Schicha, 1983
- Amblyseius tenuis Wu & Ou, 2001
- Amblyseius tianmuensis Liang & Lao, 1994
- Amblyseius triangulus Wu, Lan & Zeng, 1997
- Amblyseius trisetosus Tseng, 1983
- Amblyseius tsugawai Ehara, 1959
- Amblyseius tubae Karg, 1970
- Amblyseius tuscus Berlese, 1914
- Amblyseius utricularius Karg, 1994
- Amblyseius utriculus Karg, 1989
- Amblyseius valpoensis Gonzalez & Schuster, 1962
- Amblyseius vasiformis Moraes & Mesa, in Moraes, Mesa & Braun 1991
- Amblyseius verginensis Papadoulis, 1995
- Amblyseius volcanus Prasad, 1968
- Amblyseius waltersi Schicha, 1981
- Amblyseius wangi (Yin, Bei & Lu, 1992)
- Amblyseius wanka Schicha & Corpuz-Raros, 1992
- Amblyseius williamsi Schicha, 1983
- Amblyseius wuyiensis Wu & Li, 1983
- Amblyseius yadongensis Wu, 1987
- Amblyseius zaheri Yousef & El-Brollosy, in Zaher 1986

- Archeosetus Chant & McMurtry, 2002

- Archeosetus rackae (Fain, 1987)

- Arrenoseius Wainstein, 1962

- Arrenoseius palustris (Chant, 1960)

- Asperoseius Chant, 1957

- Asperoseius africanus Chant, 1957
- Asperoseius australiensis Fain & Krantz, 1990
- Asperoseius baguioensis Corpuz-Raros, 1994
- Asperoseius henryae Fain & Krantz, 1990
- Asperoseius lagunensis Corpuz-Raros, 1994

- Chelaseius Muma & Denmark, 1968

- Chelaseius austrellus (Athias-Henriot, 1967)
- Chelaseius brazilensis Denmark & Kolodochka, 1990
- Chelaseius caudatus Karg, 1983
- Chelaseius floridanus (Muma, 1955)
- Chelaseius freni Karg, 1976
- Chelaseius lativentris Karg, 1983
- Chelaseius schusterellus (Athias-Henriot, 1967)
- Chelaseius tundra (Chant & Hansell, 1971)
- Chelaseius valliculosus Kolodochka, 1987
- Chelaseius vicinus (Muma, 1965)

- Chileseius Gonzalez & Schuster, 1962

- Chileseius camposi Gonzalez & Schuster, 1962
- Chileseius paracamposi Yoshida-Shaul & Chant, 1991 — also as paracomposi

- Eharius Tuttle & Muma, 1973

- Eharius chergui (Athias-Henriot, 1960)
- Eharius hermonensis Amitai & Swirski, 1980
- Eharius hymetticus (Papadoulis & Emmanouel, 1991)
- Eharius kostini (Kolodochka, 1979)
- Eharius kuznetzovi (Kolodochka, 1979)
- Eharius marzhaniani (Arutunjan, 1969)

- Euseius De Leon, 1967

- Euseius caseariae De Leon, 1967
- Euseius castaneae (Wang & Xu, 1987)
- Euseius circellatus (Wu & Li, 1983) — synonym of kalimpongensis ?
- Euseius citri (van der Merwe & Ryke, 1964)
- Euseius citrifolius Denmark & Muma, 1970
- Euseius coccineae (Gupta, 1975)
- Euseius coccosocius (Ghai & Menon, 1967)
- Euseius concordis (Chant, 1959)
- Euseius consors (De Leon, 1962)
- Euseius densus (Wu, 1984)
- Euseius dossei (Pritchard & Baker, 1962)
- Euseius dowdi (Schicha, 1993)
- Euseius eitanae (Swirski & Amitai, 1965)
- Euseius elinae (Schicha, 1977)
- Euseius emanus (El-Banhawy, 1979)
- Euseius errabundus De Leon, 1967
- Euseius erugatus (van der Merwe & Ryke, 1964)
- Euseius eucalypti (Ghai & Menon, 1967)
- Euseius aferulus (Chant, 1959)
- Euseius affinis Qayyum, Akbar & Afzal, 2001
- Euseius africanus (Evans, 1954)
- Euseius ahaioensis (Gupta, 1992)
- Euseius aizawai (Ehara & Bhandhufalck, 1977)
- Euseius alangii (Liang & Ke, 1981)
- Euseius alatus De Leon, 1966
- Euseius albizziae (Swirski & Ragusa, 1978)
- Euseius aleyrodis (El-Badry, 1967)
- Euseius alterno Qayyum, Akbar & Afzal, 2001
- Euseius alstoniae (Gupta, 1975)
- Euseius amabilis Khan, Chaudhri & Khan, 1992
- Euseius amissibilis Meshkov, 1991
- Euseius andrei (Ueckermann & Loots, 1988)
- Euseius apsheronica Abbasova & Mekhtieva, 1991
- Euseius australis (Wu & Li, 1983) — synonym of aizawai ?
- Euseius badius Khan & Chaudhri, 1991
- Euseius baetae (Meyer & Rodrigues, 1966)
- Euseius bambusae (Ghai & Menon, 1967)
- Euseius batus (Ueckermann & Loots, 1988)
- Euseius beninensis Moraes & McMurtry, in Moraes, McMurtry & Yaninek 1989
- Euseius brazilli (El-Banhawy, 1975)
- Euseius brevifistulae Karg, 1997
- Euseius bwende (Pritchard & Baker, 1962)
- Euseius facundus (Khan & Chaudhri, 1969)
- Euseius finlandicus (Oudemans, 1915)
- Euseius fructicolus (Gonzalez & Schuster, 1962)
- Euseius fustis (Pritchard & Baker, 1962)
- Euseius ghilarovi Kolodochka, 1988
- Euseius guangxiensis (Wu, 1982)
- Euseius haramotoi (Prasad, 1968)
- Euseius hibisci (Chant, 1959)
- Euseius hima (Pritchard & Baker, 1962)
- Euseius ho (De Leon, 1965)
- Euseius hutu (Pritchard & Baker, 1962)
- Euseius inouei (Ehara & Moraes, 1998)
- Euseius insanus (Khan & Chaudhri, 1969)
- Euseius kalimpongensis (Gupta, 1969) — synonym is circellatus ?
- Euseius kenyae (Swirski & Ragusa, 1978)
- Euseius kirghisicus (Kolodochka, 1979)
- Euseius lasalasi Denmark & Evans, in Denmark, Evans, Aguilar, Vargas & Ochoa 1999
- Euseius lecodactylus Ueckermann, 1996
- Euseius lokele (Pritchard & Baker, 1962)
- Euseius longicervix (Liang & Ke, 1983)
- Euseius longiverticalis (Liang & Ke, 1983)
- Euseius macrospatulatus (Gupta, 1986)
- Euseius magucii (Meyer & Rodrigues, 1966)
- Euseius mangiferae (Ghai & Menon, 1967)
- Euseius mba (Pritchard & Baker, 1962)
- Euseius mediocris Chaudhri, Akbar & Rasool, 1979
- Euseius mesembrinus (Dean, 1957)
- Euseius minutisetus Moraes & McMurtry, in Moraes, McMurtry, van den Berg & Yaninek 1989
- Euseius multimicropilis De Leon, 1967
- Euseius mundillovalis (Schicha, 1987)
- Euseius myrobalanus (Ueckermann & Loots, 1988)
- Euseius naindaimei (Chant & Baker, 1965)
- Euseius natalensis (van der Merwe, 1965)
- Euseius neococciniae (Gupta, 1978)
- Euseius neodossei Moraes, Ueckermann & Oliveira, in Moraes, Ueckermann, Oliveira & Yaninek 2001
- Euseius neofustis Moraes & McMurtry, 1988
- Euseius neolokele Moraes, Ueckermann & Oliveira, in Moraes, Ueckermann, Oliveira & Yaninek 2001
- Euseius neomagucii Ueckermann, Moraes & Oliveira, in Moraes, Ueckermann, Oliveira & Yaninek 2001
- Euseius neovictoriensis (Schicha, 1979)
- Euseius nertitus (El-Badry, 1968)
- Euseius nicholsi (Ehara & Lee, 1971)
- Euseius nigeriaensis Moraes, Ueckermann & Oliveira, in Moraes, Ueckermann, Oliveira & Yaninek 2001
- Euseius notatus (Chaudhri, 1968)
- Euseius noumeae (Schicha, 1979)
- Euseius nyalensis (El-Badry, 1968)
- Euseius obispensis Aponte & McMurtry, 1997
- Euseius obtectus Khan, Chaudhri & Khan, 1992
- Euseius odoratus Khan & Chaudhri, 1991
- Euseius okumae (Ehara & Bhandhufalck, 1977)
- Euseius olivi (Nasr & Abou-Awad, 1985)
- Euseius orcula Khan, Chaudhri & Khan, 1992
- Euseius orientalis (El-Badry, 1968)
- Euseius orygmus (Ueckermann & Loots, 1988)
- Euseius ovalis (Evans, 1953)
- Euseius ovaloides (Blommers, 1974)
- Euseius pafuriensis (van der Merwe, 1968)
- Euseius papayana (van der Merwe, 1965)
- Euseius passiflorus Denmark & Evans, in Denmark, Evans, Aguilar, Vargas & Ochoa 1999
- Euseius plaudus Denmark & Muma, 1973
- Euseius plazo Ahmad, Yasmin & Chaudhri, 1987
- Euseius plebeius (van der Merwe, 1968)
- Euseius ploreraformis (Schicha & Corpuz-Raros, 1992)
- Euseius prolixus (van der Merwe, 1968)
- Euseius pruni (Gupta, 1975)
- Euseius querci (Liang & Ke, 1983)
- Euseius quetzali McMurtry, in McMurtry, Badii & Congdon 1985
- Euseius relictus Chaudhri, Akbar & Rasool, 1979
- Euseius reticulatus Moraes, Ueckermann & Oliveira, in Moraes, Ueckermann, Oliveira & Yaninek 2001
- Euseius rhododendronis (Gupta, 1970)
- Euseius ricinus Moraes, Denmark & Guerrero, 1982
- Euseius rotundus (Blommers, 1973)
- Euseius rubicolus (van der Merwe & Ryke, 1964)
- Euseius ruiliensis (Wu & Li, 1985)
- Euseius sacchari (Ghai & Menon, 1967)
- Euseius sacchari (Liang & Ke, 1983) — praeoccupied Ghai & Menon 1967
- Euseius sakagamii (Ehara, 1966)
- Euseius semotus Ashmad, Yasmin & Chaudhri, 1987
- Euseius scutalis (Athias-Henriot, 1958)
- Euseius septicus Chaudhri, Akbar & Rasool, 1979
- Euseius sibelius (De Leon, 1962)
- Euseius subalatus (De Leon, 1965)
- Euseius similiovalis (Liang & Ke, 1983)
- Euseius sojaensis (Ehara, 1964)
- Euseius spermahyphus (Ueckermann & Loots, 1988)
- Euseius stipulatus (Athias-Henriot, 1960)
- Euseius subplebeius (Wu & Li, 1984)
- Euseius talinga (Pritchard & Baker, 1962)
- Euseius terenos Ahmad, Yasmin & Chaudhri, 1987
- Euseius transvaalensis (van der Merwe & Ryke, 1964)
- Euseius tularensis Congdon, in Congdon & McMurtry 1985
- Euseius tutsi (Pritchard & Baker, 1962)
- Euseius ucrainicus (Kolodochka, 1979)
- Euseius ugandaensis Moraes, Ueckermann & Oliveira, in Moraes, Ueckermann, Oliveira & Yaninek 2001
- Euseius unisetus Moraes & McMurtry, 1983
- Euseius urceus (De Leon, 1962)
- Euseius utilis (Liang & Ke, 1983)
- Euseius vanderbergae (Ueckermann & Loots, 1988)
- Euseius victoriensis (Womersley, 1954)
- Euseius vignus Rishi & Rather, 1983
- Euseius vitrum Ahmad, Yasmin & Chaudhri, 1987
- Euseius vulgaris (Liang & Ke, 1983)
- Euseius wyebo (Schicha & Corpuz-Raros, 1992)
- Euseius yousefi (Zaher & El-Brollosy, 1986)
- Euseius zairensis Moraes, Ueckermann & Oliveira, in Moraes, Ueckermann, Oliveira & Yaninek 2001
- Euseius zambiaensis Moraes, Ueckermann & Oliveira, in Moraes, Ueckermann, Oliveira & Yaninek 2001

- Evansoseius Sheals, 1962

- Evansoseius macfarlanei Sheals, 1962

- Fundiseius Muma & Denmark, in Muma 1970

- Fundiseius arenicolus (Muma, 1965)
- Fundiseius cavei Denmark & Evans, in Denmark, Evans, Aguilar, Vargas & Ochoa 1999
- Fundiseius cesi (Muma, 1965)
- Fundiseius coronatus (Fox, 1946)
- Fundiseius costaricus Denmark & Evans, in Denmark, Evans, Aguilar, Vargas & Ochoa 1999
- Fundiseius gonzalezi (Athias-Henriot, 1967)
- Fundiseius grandis (Berlese, 1914)
- Fundiseius hapoli (Gupta, 1986)
- Fundiseius imbricata (Muma & Denmark, 1969)
- Fundiseius morgani (Chant, 1957)
- Fundiseius sentralus Denmark & Evans, in Denmark, Evans, Aguilar, Vargas & Ochoa 1999
- Fundiseius timagami (Chant & Hansell, 1971)
- Fundiseius tucumanensis (Sheals, 1962)
- Fundiseius urquharti (Yoshida-Shaul & Chant, 1988)

- Honduriella Denmark & Evans, 1999

- Honduriella maxima Denmark & Evans, in Denmark, Evans, Aguilar, Vargas & Ochoa 1999

- Indoseiulus Ehara, 1982

- Indoseiulus duanensis Liang & Zeng, 1992 — placement?
- Indoseiulus eharai Gupta, 1986
- Indoseiulus ghaiae Denmark & Kolodochka, 1993
- Indoseiulus irregularis (Evans, 1953)
- Indoseiulus liturivorus (Ehara, 1982)
- Indoseiulus ricini (Ghai & Menon, 1969)
- Indoseiulus semirregularis (Schicha & Corpuz-Raros, 1992)

- Iphiseiodes De Leon, 1966

- Iphiseiodes kamahorae De Leon, 1966
- Iphiseiodes metapodalis (El-Banhawy, 1984)
- Iphiseiodes neonobilis Denmark & Muma, 1978
- Iphiseiodes nobilis (Chant & Baker, 1965)
- Iphiseiodes quadripilis (Banks, 1904)
- Iphiseiodes setillus Gondim Jr. & Moraes, 2001
- Iphiseiodes zuluagai Denmark & Muma, 1972

- Iphiseius Berlese, 1921

- Iphiseius degenerans (Berlese, 1889)
- Iphiseius martigellus El-Badry, 1968

- Kampimodromus Nesbitt, 1951

- Kampimodromus aberrans (Oudemans, 1930)
- Kampimodromus adrianae Ferragut & Pena-Estevez, 2003
- Kampimodromus alettae (Ueckermann & Loots, 1985)
- Kampimodromus coryli Meshkov, 1999
- Kampimodromus echii Ferragut & Pena-Estevez, 2003
- Kampimodromus elongatus (Oudemans, 1930)
- Kampimodromus ericinus Ragusa Di Chiara & Tsolakis, 1994
- Kampimodromus hmiminai McMurtry & Bounfour, 1989
- Kampimodromus judaicus (Swirski & Amitai, 1961)
- Kampimodromus keae (Papadoulis & Emmanouel, 1991)
- Kampimodromus langei Wainstein & Arutunjan, 1973
- Kampimodromus molle (Ueckermann & Loots, 1985)
- Kampimodromus ragusai Swirski & Amitai, 1997 — aberrans?

- Kampimoseiulella Chant & McMurtry, 2003

- Kampimoseiulella altusus (van der Merwe, 1968)
- Kampimoseiulella reburrus (van der Merwe, 1968)

- Knopkirie Beard, 2001

- Knopkirie banksiae (McMurtry & Schicha, 1987)
- Knopkirie patriciae Beard, 2001
- Knopkirie petri Beard, 2001
- Knopkirie volutus Beard, 2001

- Macmurtryseius Kolodochka & Denmark, 1995

- Macmurtryseius armellae (Schicha & Gutierrez, 1985)
- Macmurtryseius christinae (Schicha, 1981)
- Macmurtryseius hebridensis (McMurtry & Moraes, 1984)

- Macroseius Chant, Denmark & Baker, 1959

- Macroseius biscutatus Chant, Denmark & Baker, 1959

- Neoparaphytoseius Chant & McMurtry, 2003

- Neoparaphytoseius sooretamus (El-Banhawy, 1984)

- Neoseiulus Hughes, 1948

- Neoseiulus accessus (Ueckermann & Loots, 1988)
- Neoseiulus aceriae (Gupta, 1975)
- Neoseiulus aegyptocitri (Kandeel & El-Halawany, 1986)
- Neoseiulus agrestis (Karg, 1960)
- Neoseiulus akakius Beard, 2001
- Neoseiulus aleurites Ragusa & Athias-Henriot, 1983
- Neoseiulus alidis (Kolodochka, 1989)
- Neoseiulus allenrolfius (Denmark, 1993)
- Neoseiulus alpinus (Schweizer, 1922)
- Neoseiulus alustoni (Livshitz & Kuznetsov, 1972)
- Neoseiulus amicus (Chant, 1959)
- Neoseiulus angeliquae (Schicha, 1987)
- Neoseiulus anonymus (Chant & Baker, 1965)
- Neoseiulus apeuthus Beard, 2001
- Neoseiulus apkutik (Chant & Hansell, 1971)
- Neoseiulus arcticus (Chant & Hansell, 1971)
- Neoseiulus arenarius Denmark & Edland, 2002
- Neoseiulus arenillus (Denmark & Muma, 1967) — ??
- Neoseiulus argillaceus (Kolodochka & Bondarenko, 1993)
- Neoseiulus aridus (De Leon, 1962)
- Neoseiulus arutunjani (Wainstein & Beglyarov, 1971)
- Neoseiulus astutus (Beglyarov, 1960)
- Neoseiulus atrii (Karg, 1989)
- Neoseiulus atsak (Chant & Hansell, 1971)
- Neoseiulus australograminis (Wainstein, 1977)
- Neoseiulus balisungsongus (Schicha & Corpuz-Raros, 1992)
- Neoseiulus baraki (Athias-Henriot, 1966)
- Neoseiulus bariles (Schicha & Corpuz-Raros, 1992)
- Neoseiulus barkeri Hughes, 1948
- Neoseiulus baticola (Athias-Henriot, 1977)
- Neoseiulus bayviewensis (Schicha, 1977)
- Neoseiulus bellinus (Womersley, 1954)
- Neoseiulus bellottii (Moraes & Mesa, 1988)
- Neoseiulus benicus (El-Badry, 1968)
- Neoseiulus benjamini (Schicha, 1981)
- Neoseiulus bheraensis Chaudhri, Akbar & Rasool, 1979
- Neoseiulus bicaudus (Wainstein, 1962)
- Neoseiulus brevicalix (Karg, 1993)
- Neoseiulus brevispinus (Kennett, 1958)
- Neoseiulus brigarinus Beard, 2001
- Neoseiulus buxeus Beard, 2001
- Neoseiulus byssus Denmark & Knisley, in Knisley & Denmark 1978
- Neoseiulus californicus (McGregor, 1954)
- Neoseiulus callunae (Willmann, 1952)
- Neoseiulus calorai (Corpuz-Raros & Rimando, 1966)
- Neoseiulus camarus (El-Badry, 1968)
- Neoseiulus campanus Beard, 2001
- Neoseiulus cangaro (Schicha, 1987)
- Neoseiulus caobae (De Leon, 1965)
- Neoseiulus cappari Beard, 2001
- Neoseiulus caruncula Chaudhri, Akbar & Rasool, 1979
- Neoseiulus caribbeanus (De Leon, 1965)
- Neoseiulus carverae (Schicha, 1993)
- Neoseiulus casimiri (Schicha & Elshafie, 1980)
- Neoseiulus cavagnaroi (Schuster, 1966)
- Neoseiulus ceratoni (Ueckermann & Loots, 1988)
- Neoseiulus certus (Kolodochka, 1990)
- Neoseiulus chascomensis (Sheals, 1962)
- Neoseiulus chaudhrii Chant & McMurtry, 2003
- Neoseiulus chinensis Chant & McMurtry, 2003
- Neoseiulus cinctutus (Livshitz & Kuznetsov, 1972)
- Neoseiulus coatesi (Schultz, 1972)
- Neoseiulus collegae (De Leon, 1962)
- Neoseiulus comitatus (De Leon, 1962)
- Neoseiulus communis Denmark & Edland, 2002
- Neoseiulus conconiensis (Karg, 1976)
- Neoseiulus constrictatus (El-Banhawy, 1984)
- Neoseiulus conterminus (Kolodochka, 1990)
- Neoseiulus corycus (Schuster, 1966)
- Neoseiulus crataegi (Jorgensen & Chant, 1960)
- Neoseiulus cree (Chant & Hansell, 1971)
- Neoseiulus cryptomeriae (Zhu & Chen, 1983)
- Neoseiulus cucumeris (Oudemans, 1930)
- Neoseiulus cucumeroides (De Leon, 1959)
- Neoseiulus culpus Denmark & Evans, in Denmark, Evans, Aguilar, Vargas & Ochoa 1999
- Neoseiulus curvus (Wu & Li, 1985)
- Neoseiulus cydnodactylon (Shehata & Zaher, 1969)
- Neoseiulus cynodonae (Gupta, 1977)
- Neoseiulus depilo Khan, Chaudhri & Khan, 1990
- Neoseiulus desertus (Chant, 1957)
- Neoseiulus dicircellatus (Wu & Ou, 1999)
- Neoseiulus dieteri (Schicha, 1979)
- Neoseiulus disparis (Chaudhri, Akbar & Rasool, 1979)
- Neoseiulus dissipatus (Kolodochka, 1991)
- Neoseiulus dodonaeae (Schicha, 1980)
- Neoseiulus dungeri (Karg, 1977)
- Neoseiulus echinochlovorus (Schicha & Corpuz-Raros, 1992)
- Neoseiulus edestes Beard, 2001
- Neoseiulus ellesmerei (Chant & Hansell, 1971)
- Neoseiulus engaddensis (Amitai & Swirski, 1970)
- Neoseiulus eremicus Chaudhri, Akbar & Rasool, 1979
- Neoseiulus eremitus Beard, 2001
- Neoseiulus erugatus Ragusa & Athias-Henriot, 1983
- Neoseiulus esculentus (El-Badry, 1968)
- Neoseiulus eucolli (Karg, 1993)
- Neoseiulus exiguus (van der Merwe, 1968)
- Neoseiulus extricatus (Kolodochka, 1991)
- Neoseiulus fallacis (Garman, 1948)
- Neoseiulus fallacoides Tuttle & Muma, 1973
- Neoseiulus fauveli (Athias-Henriot, 1978)
- Neoseiulus ficilocus (Schicha & Corpuz-Raros, 1992)
- Neoseiulus ficusi (Gupta, 1986)
- Neoseiulus foramenis (Karg, 1970)
- Neoseiulus gansuensis (Wu & Lan, 1991)
- Neoseiulus garciai (Schicha & Corpuz-Raros, 1992)
- Neoseiulus ghanii (Muma, 1967)
- Neoseiulus gracilentus (Hirschmann, 1962)
- Neoseiulus gracilis (Muma, 1962)
- Neoseiulus haimatus (Ehara, 1967)
- Neoseiulus hamus (Karg, 1993)
- Neoseiulus hanselli (Chant & Yoshida-Shaul, 1978)
- Neoseiulus harrowi (Collyer, 1964)
- Neoseiulus harveyi (McMurtry & Schicha, 1987)
- Neoseiulus helmi (Schicha, 1987)
- Neoseiulus herbarius (Wainstein, 1960)
- Neoseiulus hirotae (Ehara, 1985)
- Neoseiulus houstoni (Schicha, 1987)
- Neoseiulus huffakeri (Schuster & Pritchard, 1963)
- Neoseiulus huron (Chant & Hansell, 1971)
- Neoseiulus idaeus Denmark & Muma, 1973
- Neoseiulus imbricatus (Corpuz-Raros & Rimando, 1966)
- Neoseiulus inabanus (Ehara, 1972)
- Neoseiulus inak (Chant & Hansell, 1971)
- Neoseiulus indicus (Narayanan & Kaur, 1960)
- Neoseiulus bindrai (Gupta, 1977)
- Neoseiulus inflatus (Kuznetsov, 1984)
- Neoseiulus innuit (Chant & Hansell, 1971)
- Neoseiulus inornatus (Schuster & Pritchard, 1963)
- Neoseiulus insularis (Athias-Henriot, 1978)
- Neoseiulus interfolius (De Leon, 1962)
- Neoseiulus iroquois (Chant & Hansell, 1971)
- Neoseiulus jiangxiensis (Zhu & Chen, 1982)
- Neoseiulus kapjik (Chant & Hansell, 1971)
- Neoseiulus kearnae Beard, 2001
- Neoseiulus kennetti (Schuster & Pitchard, 1963)
- Neoseiulus kermanicus Daneshvar, 1987
- Neoseiulus kerri Muma, 1965
- Neoseiulus kodryensis (Kolodochka, 1980)
- Neoseiulus kolodotshkai (Kuznetsov, 1984)
- Neoseiulus koyamanus (Ehara & Yokogawa, 1977)
- Neoseiulus krugeri (van der Merwe, 1968)
- Neoseiulus lablabi (Ghai & Menon, 1967)
- Neoseiulus lamticus (Athias-Henriot, 1977)
- Neoseiulus lateralis (Tuttle & Muma, 1973)
- Neoseiulus latoventris (Karg & Edland, 1987)
- Neoseiulus lecki Beard, 2001
- Neoseiulus leigongshanensis (Wu & Lan, 1989)
- Neoseiulus letrauformis (Schicha & Corpuz-Raros, 1992)
- Neoseiulus leucophaeus (Athias-Henriot, 1959)
- Neoseiulus liangi Chant & McMurtry, 2003
- Neoseiulus liticellus (Athias-Henriot, 1966)
- Neoseiulus longilaterus (Athias-Henriot, 1957)
- Neoseiulus longisiphonulus (Wu & Lan, 1989)
- Neoseiulus longispinosus (Evans, 1952)
- Neoseiulus loxtoni (Schicha, 1979)
- Neoseiulus loxus (Schuster & Pritchard, 1963)
- Neoseiulus lula (Pritchard & Baker, 1962)
- Neoseiulus luppovae (Wainstein, 1962)
- Neoseiulus lushanensis (Zhu & Chen, 1985)
- Neoseiulus lyrinus Beard, 2001
- Neoseiulus maigsius (Schicha & Corpuz-Raros, 1992)
- Neoseiulus makedonicus (Papadoulis & Emmanouel, 1991)
- Neoseiulus makilingensis (Schicha & Corpuz-Raros, 1992)
- Neoseiulus makuwa (Ehara, 1972)
- Neoseiulus malaban Beard, 2001
- Neoseiulus marginatus (Wainstein, 1961)
- Neoseiulus marinellus (Muma, 1962)
- Neoseiulus marinus (Willmann, 1952)
- Neoseiulus martinicensis Moraes & Kreiter, in Moraes, Kreiter & Lofego 2000
- Neoseiulus mazurensis (Kropczynska, 1965)
- Neoseiulus melaleucae (McMurtry & Schicha, 1987)
- Neoseiulus melinis Lofego & Moraes, 2003
- Neoseiulus micmac (Chant & Hansell, 1971)
- Neoseiulus mistassini (Chant & Hansell, 1971)
- Neoseiulus monomacroseta (Tseng, 1976)
- Neoseiulus montanus (Wainstein, 1962)
- Neoseiulus montanus Tuttle & Muma, 1973 — praeoccupied Wainstein 1962
- Neoseiulus msabahaensis (Moraes & McMurtry, 1989)
- Neoseiulus muganicus (Abbasova, 1970)
- Neoseiulus multiporus (Wu & Li, 1987)
- Neoseiulus mumae (Shehata & Zaher, 1969)
- Neoseiulus mumai (Denmark, 1965)
- Neoseiulus myrtea Chaudhri, Akbar & Rasool, 1979
- Neoseiulus namurensis (Fain, Vangeluwe, Degreef & Wauthy, 1993)
- Neoseiulus neoaurescens (Moraes & Mesa, 1988)
- Neoseiulus neoparaki (Ehara, 1972)
- Neoseiulus neoreticuloides (Liang & Hu, 1988)
- Neoseiulus neotunus (Denmark & Muma, 1973)
- Neoseiulus nescapi (Chant & Hansell, 1971)
- Neoseiulus nodus Denmark & Knisley, in Knisley & Denmark 1978
- Neoseiulus noosae (McMurtry & Schicha, 1987)
- Neoseiulus novaescotiae (Chant, 1959)
- Neoseiulus ojibwa (Chant & Hansell, 1971)
- Neoseiulus orientalis (El-Halawany & Kandeel, 1985)
- Neoseiulus ornatus (Athias-Henriot, 1957)
- Neoseiulus oryzacolus Daneshvar, 1987
- Neoseiulus ostium Khan, Chaudhri & Khan, 1990
- Neoseiulus paloratus Beard, 2001
- Neoseiulus pannuceus Beard, 2001
- Neoseiulus papenfussi (Schuster, 1966)
- Neoseiulus paraibensis (Moraes & McMurtry, 1983)
- Neoseiulus paraki (Ehara, 1967)
- Neoseiulus paramarinus Evans, 1988
- Neoseiulus parvipilis (Athias-Henriot, 1978)
- Neoseiulus paspalivorus (De Leon, 1957)
- Neoseiulus pegasus (Schuster, 1966)
- Neoseiulus perfectus (Chaudhri, 1968)
- Neoseiulus perspectus (Kolodochka, 1992)
- Neoseiulus peruanas (El-Banhawy, 1979)
- Neoseiulus phragmitidis (Bozai, 1997)
- Neoseiulus picanus (Ragusa, 2000)
- Neoseiulus pieteri (Schultz, 1972)
- Neoseiulus placitus (Khan & Chaudhri, 1969)
- Neoseiulus planatus (Muma, 1962)
- Neoseiulus plantagenis (Kolodochka, 1981)
- Neoseiulus pluridentatus Lofego & Moraes, 2003
- Neoseiulus poculi (Karg, 1976)
- Neoseiulus populi (Bozai, 1997)
- Neoseiulus pristisimilis (Karg, 1993)
- Neoseiulus provectus (Kolodochka, 1991)
- Neoseiulus pseudaequipilus (Wainstein & Abbasova, 1974)
- Neoseiulus pseudoherbarius Meshkov, 1994
- Neoseiulus pseudoumbraticus (Chant & Yoshida-Shaul, 1982)
- Neoseiulus pulupotus (Schicha & Corpuz-Raros, 1992)
- Neoseiulus quaesitus (Wainstein & Beglyarov, 1971)
- Neoseiulus queenslandensis (McMurtry & Schicha, 1987)
- Neoseiulus rambami (Swirski & Amitai, 1990)
- Neoseiulus rancidus (Chaudhri, Akbar & Rasool, 1979)
- Neoseiulus rarosi (Schicha & Corpuz-Raros, 1992)
- Neoseiulus recifensis Gondim Jr. & Moraes, 2001
- Neoseiulus reductus (Wainstein, 1962)
- Neoseiulus reticulatus (Oudemans, 1930)
- Neoseiulus reticuloides (Wainstein, 1975)
- Neoseiulus ribes Denmark & Edland, 2002
- Neoseiulus rimandoi (Schicha & Corpuz-Raros, 1992)
- Neoseiulus rufus Denmark & Evans, in Denmark, Evans, Aguilar, Vargas & Ochoa 1999
- Neoseiulus salicicola (Bozai, 1997)
- Neoseiulus salish (Chant & Hansell, 1971)
- Neoseiulus scapilatus (van der Merwe, 1965)
- Neoseiulus scoticus (Collyer, 1957)
- Neoseiulus segnis (Wainstein & Arutunjan, 1970)
- Neoseiulus sehlabati (El-Banhawy, 2002) — ??
- Neoseiulus septentrionalis (Karg, 1977)
- Neoseiulus setulus (Fox, 1947)
- Neoseiulus shambati (El-Badry, 1968)
- Neoseiulus shanksi Congdon, 2002
- Neoseiulus sharonensis (Rivnay & Swirski, 1980)
- Neoseiulus shiheziensis (Wu & Li, 1987)
- Neoseiulus simplexus (Denmark & Knisley, 1978)
- Neoseiulus sinaiticum (Amitai & Swirski, 1982)
- Neoseiulus sioux (Chant & Hansell, 1971)
- Neoseiulus sospesitis (Khan & Chaudhri, 1969)
- Neoseiulus sparaktes Beard, 2001
- Neoseiulus specus Beard, 2001
- Neoseiulus spicatus Denmark & Evans, in Denmark, Evans, Aguilar, Vargas & Ochoa 1999
- Neoseiulus spineus (Tseng, 1976)
- Neoseiulus sporobolus Tuttle & Muma, 1973
- Neoseiulus steinerae Beard, 2001
- Neoseiulus stolidus (Chaudhri, 1968)
- Neoseiulus striatus (Wu, 1983)
- Neoseiulus subreticulatus (Wu, 1987)
- Neoseiulus subrotundus (Wu & Lan, 1991)
- Neoseiulus subsolidus (Beglyarov, 1960)
- Neoseiulus sugonjaevi (Wainstein & Abbasova, 1974)
- Neoseiulus suknaensis (Gupta, 1970)
- Neoseiulus swartii Zack, 1969
- Neoseiulus tabis (Schuster & Pritchard, 1963)
- Neoseiulus tabularis Chaudhri, Akbar & Rasool, 1979
- Neoseiulus taiwanicus (Ehara, 1970)
- Neoseiulus tareensis (Schicha, 1983)
- Neoseiulus tauricus (Livshitz & Kuznetsov, 1972)
- Neoseiulus teke (Pritchard & Baker, 1962)
- Neoseiulus tenuisetae (Karg, 1993)
- Neoseiulus tervus Meshkov, 1994
- Neoseiulus thwaitei (Schicha, 1977)
- Neoseiulus tibielingmiut (Chant & Hansell, 1971)
- Neoseiulus tobon (Chant & Hansell, 1971)
- Neoseiulus tornadus (Tuttle & Muma, 1973)
- Neoseiulus transversus Denmark & Muma, 1973
- Neoseiulus triangularis (Karg, 1994)
- Neoseiulus tshernovi (Kuznetsov, 1984)
- Neoseiulus tunus (De Leon, 1967)
- Neoseiulus turangae (Kolodochka, 1982)
- Neoseiulus tuvinensis (Beglyarov & Meshkov, 1988)
- Neoseiulus tyrrelli (Chant & Hansell, 1971)
- Neoseiulus ulatei Denmark & Evans, in Denmark, Evans, Aguilar, Vargas & Ochoa 1999
- Neoseiulus uliginosus (Karg, 1976)
- Neoseiulus umbraticus (Chant, 1956)
- Neoseiulus umsteadi (Muma, Metz & Farrier, 1967) — ??
- Neoseiulus vallis (Schuster & Pritchard, 1963)
- Neoseiulus vanderlindei (van der Merwe, 1965)
- Neoseiulus vardgesi (Arutunjan, 1968)
- Neoseiulus vasoides (Karg, 1989)
- Neoseiulus vehementis (Khan & Chaudhri, 1969)
- Neoseiulus veigai Gondim Jr. & Moraes, 2001
- Neoseiulus venustus (Chaudhri, 1968)
- Neoseiulus versutus (Beglyarov, 1981)
- Neoseiulus xizangensis (Zhu & Chen, 1985)
- Neoseiulus wanrooyae Beard, 2001
- Neoseiulus warrum Beard, 2001
- Neoseiulus wearnei (Schicha, 1987)
- Neoseiulus womersleyi (Schicha, 1975)
- Neoseiulus yanoi (Ehara, 1972)
- Neoseiulus zwoelferi (Dosse, 1957) — as zwölferi

- Noeledius Muma & Denmark, 1968

- Noeledius iphiformis (Muma, 1962)

- Okiseius Ehara, 1967

- Okiseius alniseius Wainstein & Beglyarov, 1972
- Okiseius chinensis Wu, in Wu & Qian 1983
- Okiseius cowbay Walter, 1999
- Okiseius eharai Liang & Ke, 1982
- Okiseius formosanus Tseng, 1972
- Okiseius himalayana Gupta, 1986
- Okiseius juglandis (Wang & Xu, 1985)
- Okiseius maritimus (Ehara, 1967)
- Okiseius morenoi Schicha, 1987
- Okiseius sikkimensis Gupta, 1986
- Okiseius subtropicus Ehara, 1967
- Okiseius tibetagramins (Wu, 1987)
- Okiseius tribulation Walter, 1999
- Okiseius wongi Denmark & Kolodochka, in Kolodochka & Denmark 1996
- Okiseius yazuliensis Gupta, 1986

- Olpiseius Beard, 2001

- Olpiseius djarradjin Beard, 2001
- Olpiseius noncollyerae (Schicha, 1987)
- Olpiseius perthae (McMurtry & Schicha, 1987)

- Paraamblyseiulella Chant & McMurtry, 2003

- Paraamblyseiulella transmontanus (Ueckermann & Loots, 1987)

- Paraamblyseius Muma, 1962

- Paraamblyseius crassipes Denmark, 1988
- Paraamblyseius dinghuensis (Wu & Qian, 1982)
- Paraamblyseius foliatus Corpuz-Raros, 1994
- Paraamblyseius formosanus (Ehara, 1970)
- Paraamblyseius fragariae Gupta, 1980
- Paraamblyseius gloreus (El-Banhawy, 1978)
- Paraamblyseius guangdongensis (Wu & Lan, 1991)
- Paraamblyseius lecanis (Schuster & Pritchard, 1963)
- Paraamblyseius lunatus Muma, 1962
- Paraamblyseius multicircularis Gondim Jr. & Moraes, 2001
- Paraamblyseius mumai (Prasad, 1968)
- Paraamblyseius mumai Gupta, 1980 — praeoccupied Prasad 1968
- Paraamblyseius ogdeni De Leon, 1966

- Paragigagnathus Amitai & Grinberg, 1971

- Paragigagnathus amantis (Chaudhri, Akbar & Rasool, 1979)
- Paragigagnathus bidentatus (Kuznetsov, 1994)
- Paragigagnathus cataractus (Ueckermann & Loots, 1988)
- Paragigagnathus desertorum (Amitai & Swirski, 1978)
- Paragigagnathus insuetus (Livshitz & Kuznetsov, 1972)
- Paragigagnathus molestus (Kolodochka, 1989)
- Paragigagnathus namibiaensis (Ueckermann & Loots, 1988)
- Paragigagnathus strunkovae (Wainstein, 1973)
- Paragigagnathus tamaricis Amitai & Grinberg, 1971

- Parakampimodromus Chant & McMurtry, 2003

- Parakampimodromus trichophilus (Blommers, 1976)

- Paraphytoseius Swirski & Shechter, 1961

- Paraphytoseius bhadrakaliensis (Gupta, 1969)
- Paraphytoseius chihpenensis Ho & Lo, 1989
- Paraphytoseius cracentis (Corpuz & Rimando, 1966)
- Paraphytoseius hilli Beard & Walter, 1996
- Paraphytoseius horrifer (Pritchard & Baker, 1962)
- Paraphytoseius hualienensis Ho & Lo, 1989
- Paraphytoseius hyalinus (Tseng, 1973)
- Paraphytoseius nicobarensis (Gupta, 1977)
- Paraphytoseius orientalis (Narayanan, Kaur & Ghai, 1960)
- Paraphytoseius parabilis (Chaudhri, 1967)
- Paraphytoseius santurcensis De Leon, 1965
- Paraphytoseius seychellensis Schicha & Corpuz-Raros, 1985
- Paraphytoseius subtropicus (Tseng, 1972)
- Paraphytoseius scleroticus (Gupta & Ray, 1981)
- Paraphytoseius urumanus (Ehara, 1967)

- Pholaseius Beard, 2001

- Pholaseius colliculatus Beard, 2001

- Phyllodromus De Leon, 1959

- Phyllodromus leiodis De Leon, 1959
- Phyllodromus trisetatus Moraes & Melo, 1997

- Phytoscutus Muma, 1961

- Phytoscutus acaridophagus (Collyer, 1964)
- Phytoscutus bakeri (Gupta, 1980)
- Phytoscutus eugenus (Ueckermann & Loots, 1985)
- Phytoscutus glomus (Pritchard & Baker, 1962)
- Phytoscutus gongylus (Pritchard & Baker, 1962)
- Phytoscutus reunionensis (Ueckermann & Loots, 1985)
- Phytoscutus salebrosus (Chant, 1960)
- Phytoscutus sexpilis Muma, 1961
- Phytoscutus vaughni (Chant & Baker, 1965)
- Phytoscutus wiesei (Ueckermann & Loots, 1985)
- Phytoscutus wongsirii (Ehara & Bhandhufalck, 1977)

- Phytoseiulus Evans, 1952

- Phytoseiulus fragariae Denmark & Schicha, 1983
- Phytoseiulus longipes Evans, 1958
- Phytoseiulus macropilis (Banks, 1904)
- Phytoseiulus persimilis Athias-Henriot, 1957
- Phytoseiulus riegeli Dosse, 1958
- Phytoseiulus robertsi (Baker, 1990)
- Phytoseiulus tardi (Lombardini, 1959)

- Proprioseiopsis Muma, 1961

- Proprioseiopsis acalyphae Denmark & Evans, in Denmark, Evans, Aguilar, Vargas & Ochoa 1999
- Proprioseiopsis acapius Karg, 1976
- Proprioseiopsis amotus (Zack, 1969)
- Proprioseiopsis amplus (Wainstein, 1983)
- Proprioseiopsis anthurii (Schicha, 1993)
- Proprioseiopsis antonellii Congdon, 2002
- Proprioseiopsis arunachalensis (Gupta, 1986)
- Proprioseiopsis asetus (Chant, 1959)
- Proprioseiopsis athiasae (Hirschmann, 1962)
- Proprioseiopsis badryi (Yousef & El-Brollosy, 1986)
- Proprioseiopsis basis Karg, 1994
- Proprioseiopsis bay (Schicha, 1980)
- Proprioseiopsis beatus (Chaudhri, 1968)
- Proprioseiopsis belizensis (Yoshida-Shaul & Chant, 1991)
- Proprioseiopsis bordjelaini (Athias-Henriot, 1966)
- Proprioseiopsis borealis (Chant & Hansell, 1971)
- Proprioseiopsis bregetovae (Abbasova, 1970)
- Proprioseiopsis bulga Chaudhri, Akbar & Rasool, 1979
- Proprioseiopsis cabonus (Schicha & Elshafie, 1980)
- Proprioseiopsis caliensis (Moraes & Mesa, 1988)
- Proprioseiopsis campanulus Karg, 1979
- Proprioseiopsis cannaensis (Muma, 1962)
- Proprioseiopsis carolinianus (Muma, Metz & Farrier, 1967)
- Proprioseiopsis catinus Karg, 1976
- Proprioseiopsis cephaeli (De Leon, 1967)
- Proprioseiopsis chilosus (van der Merwe, 1968)
- Proprioseiopsis circulus Tuttle & Muma, 1973
- Proprioseiopsis citri (Muma, 1962)
- Proprioseiopsis clausae (Muma, 1962)
- Proprioseiopsis coniferus (Prasad, 1968)
- Proprioseiopsis dacus (Wainstein, 1973)
- Proprioseiopsis dahonagnas (Schicha & Corpuz-Raros, 1992)
- Proprioseiopsis dentatus Chaudhri, Akbar & Rasool, 1979
- Proprioseiopsis detritus (Muma, 1961)
- Proprioseiopsis dominigos (El-Banhawy, 1984)
- Proprioseiopsis donchanti (Athias-Henriot, 1967)
- Proprioseiopsis dorsatus (Muma, 1961)
- Proprioseiopsis edbakeri (Athias-Henriot, 1967)
- Proprioseiopsis euflagellatus Karg, 1983
- Proprioseiopsis eudentatus Karg, 1989
- Proprioseiopsis eurynotus (van der Merwe, 1968)
- Proprioseiopsis euscutatus Karg, 1983
- Proprioseiopsis exitus (Schuster, 1966)
- Proprioseiopsis exopodalis (Kennett, 1958)
- Proprioseiopsis farallonicus (Moraes & Mesa, 1991)
- Proprioseiopsis ferratus Karg, 1976
- Proprioseiopsis fragariae (Kennett, 1958)
- Proprioseiopsis gallus Karg, 1989
- Proprioseiopsis gelikmani (Wainstein & Arutunjan, 1970)
- Proprioseiopsis genitalis Karg, 1976
- Proprioseiopsis gerezianus (Athias-Henriot, 1966)
- Proprioseiopsis globosus (Gonzalez & Schuster, 1962)
- Proprioseiopsis globosus Karg, 1976 — praeoccupied Gonzalez & Schuster 1962
- Proprioseiopsis gracilisetae (Muma, 1962)
- Proprioseiopsis grovesae (Chant, 1959)
- Proprioseiopsis guatemalensis (Chant, 1959)
- Proprioseiopsis hawaiiensis (Wainstein, 1983)
- Proprioseiopsis hudsonianus (Chant & Hansell, 1971)
- Proprioseiopsis inflatus (De Leon, 1965)
- Proprioseiopsis involutus Denmark & Knisley, in Knisley & Denmark 1978
- Proprioseiopsis iorgius Karg, 1976
- Proprioseiopsis isocaudarum Karg, 1993
- Proprioseiopsis jasmini (El-Banhawy, 1984)
- Proprioseiopsis jugortus (Athias-Henriot, 1966)
- Proprioseiopsis kogi (Chant & Hansell, 1971)
- Proprioseiopsis kopaeus (Schicha & Corpuz-Raros, 1992)
- Proprioseiopsis latocavi Karg, 1998
- Proprioseiopsis latoscutatus Karg, 1976
- Proprioseiopsis lenis (Corpuz-Raros & Rimando, 1966)
- Proprioseiopsis lepidus (Chant, 1959)
- Proprioseiopsis levani (Gomelauri, 1968)
- Proprioseiopsis lichenis (Chant, 1959)
- Proprioseiopsis lineatus (Wu & Lan, 1991)
- Proprioseiopsis marginatus Denmark, 1974
- Proprioseiopsis marrubiae Tuttle & Muma, 1973
- Proprioseiopsis mauiensis (Prasad, 1968)
- Proprioseiopsis messor (Wainstein, 1960)
- Proprioseiopsis mexicanus (Garman, 1958)
- Proprioseiopsis miconiae (Moraes & Mesa, 1991)
- Proprioseiopsis missouriensis Poe, 1970
- Proprioseiopsis mumaellus (Athias-Henriot, 1967)
- Proprioseiopsis mumamacrosetae (Hirschmann, 1962)
- Proprioseiopsis nemotoi (Ehara & Amano, 1998)
- Proprioseiopsis neomexicanus (Chant, 1959)
- Proprioseiopsis neotropicus (Ehara, 1966)
- Proprioseiopsis oblatus (Muma, 1961)
- Proprioseiopsis okanagensis (Chant, 1957)
- Proprioseiopsis oregonensis (Garman, 1958)
- Proprioseiopsis ovatus (Garman, 1958)
- Proprioseiopsis ovicinctus (Athias-Henriot, 1961)
- Proprioseiopsis pascuus (van der Merwe, 1968)
- Proprioseiopsis patellae Karg, 1989
- Proprioseiopsis penai Denmark & Evans, in Denmark, Evans, Aguilar, Vargas & Ochoa 1999
- Proprioseiopsis pentagonalis (Moraes & Mesa, 1991)
- Proprioseiopsis pentagonus (Wu & Lan, 1995)
- Proprioseiopsis penurisetus (Wainstein, 1960)
- Proprioseiopsis peruvianus (Moraes & Mesa, 1991)
- Proprioseiopsis phaseoloides Denmark & Evans, in Denmark, Evans, Aguilar, Vargas & Ochoa 1999
- Proprioseiopsis pocillatus (Athias-Henriot, 1961)
- Proprioseiopsis poculus Tuttle & Muma, 1973
- Proprioseiopsis popularis (De Leon, 1962)
- Proprioseiopsis praeanalis Karg, 1989
- Proprioseiopsis precipitans (De Leon, 1962)
- Proprioseiopsis pubes (Tseng, 1976)
- Proprioseiopsis pusillus (Kennett, 1963)
- Proprioseiopsis putmani (Chant, 1959)
- Proprioseiopsis putrephilus Meshkov, 1999
- Proprioseiopsis reventus (Zack, 1969)
- Proprioseiopsis rosellus (Chant, 1959)
- Proprioseiopsis rotundus (Muma, 1961)
- Proprioseiopsis sarraceniae (Muma, 1965)
- Proprioseiopsis scurra (Wainstein & Beglyarov, 1971)
- Proprioseiopsis septa (Garman, 1958)
- Proprioseiopsis sexsetosus (Fox, 1949)
- Proprioseiopsis sharkiensis Basha & Yousef, 1999
- Proprioseiopsis sharovi (Wainstein, 1975)
- Proprioseiopsis solens (De Leon, 1962)
- Proprioseiopsis sororculus (Wainstein, 1960)
- Proprioseiopsis sosninae (Wainstein, 1972)
- Proprioseiopsis synachattiensis (Gupta, 1985)
- Proprioseiopsis temperellus (Denmark & Muma, 1967)
- Proprioseiopsis temperus Tuttle & Muma, 1973
- Proprioseiopsis tenax (De Leon, 1967)
- Proprioseiopsis terrestris (Chant, 1959)
- Proprioseiopsis trilobae Denmark & Evans, in Denmark, Evans, Aguilar, Vargas & Ochoa 1999
- Proprioseiopsis tropicanus (Garman, 1958)
- Proprioseiopsis tubulus (Muma, 1965)
- Proprioseiopsis tulearensis (Blommers, 1976)
- Proprioseiopsis umidus Karg, 1989
- Proprioseiopsis unicus Denmark & Knisley, in Knisley & Denmark 1978
- Proprioseiopsis variocaudarum Karg, 1993
- Proprioseiopsis versutus (Zack, 1969)
- Proprioseiopsis vitreus Karg, 1998
- Proprioseiopsis vulgaris (Schuh, 1960)
- Proprioseiopsis weintraubi (Chant & Hansell, 1971)

- Proprioseiulus Muma, 1968

- Proprioseiulus darwinensis (Schicha, 1987)
- Proprioseiulus paxi (Muma, 1965)
- Proprioseiulus sandersi (Chant, 1959)

- Proprioseius Chant, 1957

- Proprioseius aculeatus Moraes & Denmark, 1999
- Proprioseius anthurus Denmark & Muma, 1966
- Proprioseius clancyi Chant, 1957
- Proprioseius gibbus Moraes & Denmark, 1999
- Proprioseius kumaonensis Gupta, 1982
- Proprioseius meridionalis Chant, 1957
- Proprioseius mirandai De Leon, 1959
- Proprioseius oudemansi (Chant, 1959)
- Proprioseius retroacuminatus Zacarias & Moraes, 2001
- Proprioseius schichai Corpuz-Raros, 1994

- Quadromalus Moraes, Denmark & Guerrero, 1982

- Quadromalus colombiensis Moraes, Denmark & Guerrero, 1982

- Ricoseius De Leon, 1965

- Ricoseius loxocheles (De Leon, 1965)

- Swirskiseius Denmark & Evans, in Denmark, Evans, Aguilar, Vargas & Ochoa 1999

- Swirskiseius zamoranus Denmark & Evans, in Denmark, Evans, Aguilar, Vargas & Ochoa 1999

- Typhlodromalus Muma, 1961

- Typhlodromalus aequidens (Blommers, 1974)
- Typhlodromalus arawak De Leon, 1966
- Typhlodromalus aripo De Leon, 1967
- Typhlodromalus athiasae (Pritchard & Baker, 1962)
- Typhlodromalus breviscutus Moraes, Oliveira & Zannou, 2001
- Typhlodromalus chikmagalurensis (Gupta, 1986)
- Typhlodromalus chitradurgae (Gupta, 1986)
- Typhlodromalus clavicus Denmark & Muma, 1973
- Typhlodromalus congeae (De Leon, 1965)
- Typhlodromalus distinctus (Denmark & Matthysse, 1981)
- Typhlodromalus endiandrae (Schicha, 1993)
- Typhlodromalus eucalypticus Gupta, 1978
- Typhlodromalus eujeniae (Gupta, 1977)
- Typhlodromalus ezoensis (Ehara, 1967)
- Typhlodromalus feresi Lofego, Moraes & McMurtry, 2000
- Typhlodromalus fragosoi (Yoshida-Shaul & Chant, 1991)
- Typhlodromalus guajavae (Gupta, 1978)
- Typhlodromalus havu (Pritchard & Baker, 1962)
- Typhlodromalus higuilloae Denmark & Muma, 1975
- Typhlodromalus hova (Blommers, 1976)
- Typhlodromalus huapingensis (Wu & Li, 1985)
- Typhlodromalus hum (Pritchard & Baker, 1962)
- Typhlodromalus jarooa (Gupta, 1977)
- Typhlodromalus jucundus (Chant, 1959)
- Typhlodromalus julus Denmark & Evans, in Denmark, Evans, Aguilar, Vargas & Ochoa 1999
- Typhlodromalus laaensis (Gupta, 1986)
- Typhlodromalus laetus (Chant & Baker, 1965)
- Typhlodromalus lailae (Schicha, 1979)
- Typhlodromalus limonicus (Garman & McGregor, 1956)
- Typhlodromalus lunatus Denmark & Evans, in Denmark, Evans, Aguilar, Vargas & Ochoa 1999
- Typhlodromalus macrosetosus (van der Merwe, 1965)
- Typhlodromalus manihoti (Moraes, 1994)
- Typhlodromalus manipurensis (Gupta, 1978)
- Typhlodromalus marmoreus (El-Banhawy, 1978)
- Typhlodromalus munsteriensis (van der Merwe, 1965)
- Typhlodromalus ntandu (Pritchard & Baker, 1962)
- Typhlodromalus olombo (Pritchard & Baker, 1962)
- Typhlodromalus peregrinus (Muma, 1955)
- Typhlodromalus planetarius (De Leon, 1959)
- Typhlodromalus propitius (Chant & Baker, 1965)
- Typhlodromalus rosayroi Denmark & Muma, 1978
- Typhlodromalus rosica (Gupta, 1992)
- Typhlodromalus rhusi (van der Merwe, 1965)
- Typhlodromalus saltus (Denmark & Matthysse, 1981)
- Typhlodromalus serengati (El-Banhawy & Abou-Awad, 1990)
- Typhlodromalus sexta (Garman, 1958)
- Typhlodromalus simus Denmark & Muma, 1973
- Typhlodromalus sorghumae (Gupta, 1977)
- Typhlodromalus spinosus (Meyer & Rodrigues, 1966)
- Typhlodromalus swaga (Pritchard & Baker, 1962)
- Typhlodromalus tasaformis (Schicha & Corpuz-Raros, 1992)
- Typhlodromalus tenuiscutus McMurtry & Moraes, 1989
- Typhlodromalus terminatus (Chant & Baker, 1965)
- Typhlodromalus tigrus Denmark & Evans, in Denmark, Evans, Aguilar, Vargas & Ochoa 1999
- Typhlodromalus ultimus (Chant & Baker, 1965)
- Typhlodromalus villacarmelensis (Moraes, 1994)
- Typhlodromalus yunquensis (De Leon, 1965)

- Typhlodromips De Leon, 1965

- Typhlodromips ablusus (Schuster & Pritchard, 1963)
- Typhlodromips aciculus De Leon, 1967
- Typhlodromips ainu (Ehara, 1967)
- Typhlodromips akahirai (Ehara, 1966)
- Typhlodromips akilinik (Chant & Hansell, 1971)
- Typhlodromips alpicola (Ehara, 1982)
- Typhlodromips altiplanumi (Ke & Xin, 1982)
- Typhlodromips amilus De Leon, 1967
- Typhlodromips andamanicus (Gupta, 1980)
- Typhlodromips annae (Schicha & Gutierrez, 1985)
- Typhlodromips anuwati (Ehara & Bhandhufalck, 1977)
- Typhlodromips arbuti (De Leon, 1961)
- Typhlodromips arcus (De Leon, 1966)
- Typhlodromips arcus Ryu, 1998 — praeoccupied De Leon 1966
- Typhlodromips arecae (Gupta, 1977)
- Typhlodromips ariri Gondim Jr. & Moraes, 2001
- Typhlodromips artemis Denmark & Evans, in Denmark, Evans, Aguilar, Vargas & Ochoa 1999
- Typhlodromips asiaticus (Evans, 1953)
- Typhlodromips assamensis (Chant, 1960)
- Typhlodromips assiniboin (Chant & Hansell, 1971)
- Typhlodromips auratus De Leon, 1966
- Typhlodromips avetianae (Arutunjan & Ohandjanian, 1972)
- Typhlodromips azerbaijanicus (Abbasova, 1970)
- Typhlodromips baiyunensis (Wu, 1982)
- Typhlodromips bangalorensis (Karg, 1983)
- Typhlodromips beelarong (Schicha & Corpuz-Raros, 1992)
- Typhlodromips benavidesi Denmark & Andrews, 1981
- Typhlodromips biflorus Denmark & Evans, in Denmark, Evans, Aguilar, Vargas & Ochoa 1999
- Typhlodromips bladderae Denmark & Evans, in Denmark, Evans, Aguilar, Vargas & Ochoa 1999
- Typhlodromips brevibrachii (Karg & Oomen-Kalsbeek, 1987)
- Typhlodromips bryophilus (Karg, 1970)
- Typhlodromips cananeiensis Gondim Jr. & Moraes, 2001
- Typhlodromips cantonensis (Schicha, 1982)
- Typhlodromips clinopodii (Ke & Xin, 1982)
- Typhlodromips collinellus (Athias-Henriot, 1966)
- Typhlodromips compressus (Wu & Li, 1984)
- Typhlodromips confertus (De Leon, 1959)
- Typhlodromips cornuformis (Schicha & Corpuz-Raros, 1992)
- Typhlodromips cotoensis (Muma, 1961)
- Typhlodromips cristobalensis (De Leon, 1962)
- Typhlodromips crotalariae (Gupta, 1977)
- Typhlodromips culmulus (van der Merwe, 1968)
- Typhlodromips daviesi De Leon, 1966
- Typhlodromips decolor (Hirschmann, 1962)
- Typhlodromips deleoni (Muma, 1962)
- Typhlodromips dentilis (De Leon, 1959)
- Typhlodromips digitulus (Denmark, 1965)
- Typhlodromips dillus (De Leon, 1959)
- Typhlodromips dimidiatus (De Leon, 1962)
- Typhlodromips dombeyus Denmark & Evans, in Denmark, Evans, Aguilar, Vargas & Ochoa 1999
- Typhlodromips draconis Chaudhri, Akbar & Rasool, 1979
- Typhlodromips driggeri (Specht, 1968)
- Typhlodromips echium Beard, 2001
- Typhlodromips enab (El-Badry, 1967)
- Typhlodromips eucalypterus (Prasad, 1968)
- Typhlodromips euserratus (Karg, 1993)
- Typhlodromips extrasetus Moraes, Oliveira & Zannou, 2001
- Typhlodromips ficus (El-Halawany & Abdeul-Samad, 1990)
- Typhlodromips filipinus (Schicha & Corpuz-Raros, 1992)
- Typhlodromips fordycei (De Leon, 1959)
- Typhlodromips fragilis (Kolodochka & Bondarenko, 1993)
- Typhlodromips friendi De Leon, 1967
- Typhlodromips frutexis Karg, 1991
- Typhlodromips genya (Pritchard & Baker, 1962)
- Typhlodromips gimanthus Beard, 2001
- Typhlodromips gonzalezi (Moraes & Mesa, 1991)
- Typhlodromips grandiductus (McMurtry & Moraes, 1985)
- Typhlodromips guizhouensis (Wu & Ou, 1999)
- Typhlodromips hamiltoni (Chant & Yoshida-Shaul, 1978)
- Typhlodromips hapoliensis (Gupta, 1986)
- Typhlodromips heidrunae (McMurtry & Schicha, 1987)
- Typhlodromips helanensis (Wu & Lan, 1991)
- Typhlodromips heterochaetus (Liang & Ke, 1984)
- Typhlodromips hellougreus Denmark & Muma, 1967
- Typhlodromips hidakai (Ehara & Bhandhufalck, 1977)
- Typhlodromips hinoki (Ehara, 1972)
- Typhlodromips huanggangensis (Wu, 1986)
- Typhlodromips ibadanensis (Ueckermann & Loots, 1988)
- Typhlodromips ignotus Beard, 2001
- Typhlodromips ihalmiut (Chant & Hansell, 1971)
- Typhlodromips ishikawai (Ehara, 1972)
- Typhlodromips isthmus Denmark & Evans, in Denmark, Evans, Aguilar, Vargas & Ochoa 1999
- Typhlodromips japonicus (Ehara, 1958)
- Typhlodromips jianyangensis (Wu, 1981)
- Typhlodromips jimenezi Denmark & Evans, in Denmark, Evans, Aguilar, Vargas & Ochoa 1999
- Typhlodromips johoreae Muma, 1967
- Typhlodromips josephi (Yoshida-Shaul & Chant, 1991)
- Typhlodromips jucara Gondim Jr. & Moraes, 2001
- Typhlodromips kakaibaeus (Schicha & Corpuz-Raros, 1992)
- Typhlodromips krantzi (Chant, 1959)
- Typhlodromips labis (Corpuz-Raros & Rimando, 1966)
- Typhlodromips lambatinus (Schicha & Corpuz-Raros, 1992)
- Typhlodromips leei (Schicha & Corpuz-Raros, 1992)
- Typhlodromips linharis (El-Banhawy, 1984)
- Typhlodromips lugubris (Chant & Baker, 1965)
- Typhlodromips lutezhicus (Wainstein, 1972)
- Typhlodromips madorellus (Athias-Henriot, 1966)
- Typhlodromips malaphilippinensis (Schicha & Corpuz-Raros, 1992)
- Typhlodromips mangleae De Leon, 1967
- Typhlodromips markwelli (Schicha, 1979)
- Typhlodromips masseei (Nesbitt, 1951)
- Typhlodromips mastus Denmark & Muma, 1967
- Typhlodromips meghalayensis (Gupta, 1978)
- Typhlodromips montdorensis (Schicha, 1979)
- Typhlodromips multisetosus (McMurtry & Moraes, 1985)
- Typhlodromips muricatus (Charlet & McMurtry, 1977)
- Typhlodromips napaeus (Wainstein, 1978)
- Typhlodromips nectae Denmark & Evans, in Denmark, Evans, Aguilar, Vargas & Ochoa 1999
- Typhlodromips neoarcus Moraes & Kreiter, in Moraes, Kreiter & Lofego 2000
- Typhlodromips neoclavicus Denmark & Evans, in Denmark, Evans, Aguilar, Vargas & Ochoa 1999
- Typhlodromips neocrotalariae Gupta, 1978
- Typhlodromips neoghanii (Gupta, 1986)
- Typhlodromips neomarkwelli (Schicha, 1980)
- Typhlodromips nestorus Beard, 2001
- Typhlodromips newsami (Evans, 1953)
- Typhlodromips occidentafricanus Moraes, Oliveira & Zannou, 2001
- Typhlodromips officinaria (Gupta, 1975)
- Typhlodromips oguroi (Ehara, 1964)
- Typhlodromips okinawanus (Ehara, 1967)
- Typhlodromips papuaensis (McMurtry & Moraes, 1985)
- Typhlodromips paulus Denmark & Muma, 1973
- Typhlodromips pederosus (El-Banhawy, 1978)
- Typhlodromips pinicolus (Karg, 1991)
- Typhlodromips plumosus (Denmark & Muma, 1975)
- Typhlodromips polyantheae (Gupta, 1975)
- Typhlodromips proximus (Kolodochka, 1991)
- Typhlodromips qinghaiensis (Wang & Xu, 1991)
- Typhlodromips quadridens (Karg & Oomen-Kalsbeek, 1987)
- Typhlodromips quercicolus (De Leon, 1959)
- Typhlodromips rademacheri (Dosse, 1958)
- Typhlodromips rangatensis (Gupta, 1977)
- Typhlodromips reptans (Blommers, 1974)
- Typhlodromips robustus (Chant & Baker, 1965)
- Typhlodromips rykei (Pritchard & Baker, 1962)
- Typhlodromips saacharus (Wu, 1981)
- Typhlodromips sabaculus Denmark & Muma, 1973
- Typhlodromips sabali (De Leon, 1959)
- Typhlodromips sanblasensis (De Leon, 1962)
- Typhlodromips sapienticola (Gupta, 1977)
- Typhlodromips scleroticus De Leon, 1966
- Typhlodromips sessor (De Leon, 1962)
- Typhlodromips shi (Pritchard & Baker, 1962)
- Typhlodromips shoreae (Gupta, 1977)
- Typhlodromips siamensis (Ehara & Bhandhufalck, 1977)
- Typhlodromips sichuanensis (Wu & Li, 1985)
- Typhlodromips sigridae (Schicha, 1982)
- Typhlodromips sijiensis (Gupta, 1986)
- Typhlodromips similis (Koch, 1839)
- Typhlodromips simplicissimus (De Leon, 1959)
- Typhlodromips sinensis Denmark & Muma, 1972
- Typhlodromips sottoi (Schicha & Corpuz-Raros, 1992)
- Typhlodromips spinigerus (Chant & Baker, 1965)
- Typhlodromips stilus (Karg & Oomen-Kalsbeek, 1987)
- Typhlodromips sturti (Schicha, 1980)
- Typhlodromips swirskii (Athias-Henriot, 1962)
- Typhlodromips syzygii (Gupta, 1975)
- Typhlodromips tanzaniensis (Yoshida-Shaul & Chant, 1988)
- Typhlodromips tennesseensis (De Leon, 1962)
- Typhlodromips tenuis (Hirschmann, 1962)
- Typhlodromips tetranychivorus Gupta, 1978
- Typhlodromips theae (Wu, 1983)
- Typhlodromips tibetapineus (Wu, 1987)
- Typhlodromips tibetasalicis (Wu, 1987)
- Typhlodromips tienhsainensis (Tseng, 1983)
- Typhlodromips tubus (Schuster, 1966)
- Typhlodromips vagatus Denmark & Evans, in Denmark, Evans, Aguilar, Vargas & Ochoa 1999
- Typhlodromips varius (Hirschmann, 1962)
- Typhlodromips vertunculus (Karg & Oomen-Kalsbeek, 1987)
- Typhlodromips vestificus (Tseng, 1976)
- Typhlodromips vignae (Liang & Ke, 1981)
- Typhlodromips vineaticus (Wainstein, 1978)
- Typhlodromips violini (Meyer & Rodrigues, 1966)
- Typhlodromips volgini (Wainstein & Beglyarov, 1971)
- Typhlodromips xui (Yin, Bei & Lu, 1992)
- Typhlodromips wunde (Schicha & Corpuz-Raros, 1992)
- Typhlodromips yandala (Schicha & Corpuz-Raros, 1992)
- Typhlodromips yarnde (Schicha & Corpuz-Raros, 1992)
- Typhlodromips yarra (Schicha & Corpuz-Raros, 1992)
- Typhlodromips yera (Schicha & Corpuz-Raros, 1992)
- Typhlodromips yerracharta (Schicha & Corpuz-Raros, 1992)
- Typhlodromips yunnanensis (Wu, 1984)

- Typhloseiella Muma, 1961

- Typhloseiella isotricha (Athias-Henriot, 1958)
- Typhloseiella perforatus (Wainstein, 1980)

== Phytoseiinae ==
Phytoseiinae Berlese, 1916

- Chantia Pritchard & Baker, 1962

- Chantia paradoxa Pritchard & Baker, 1962

- Phytoseius Ribaga, 1904

- Phytoseius acaciae Walter & Beard, 1997
- Phytoseius aleuritius Wu, 1981
- Phytoseius amba Pritchard & Baker, 1962
- Phytoseius antigamenti El-Banhawy & Abou-Awad, 1989
- Phytoseius averrhoae De Leon, 1965
- Phytoseius balcanicus Wainstein, 1969
- Phytoseius bambusae Swirski & Shechter, 1961
- Phytoseius bandipurensis Gupta, 1980
- Phytoseius bennetti De Leon, 1965
- Phytoseius betsiboka Blommers, 1976
- Phytoseius betulae Denmark, 1966
- Phytoseius blakistoni Ehara, 1966
- Phytoseius borealis Chant, 1965
- Phytoseius brevicrinis Swirski & Shechter, 1961
- Phytoseius brigalow Walter & Beard, 1997
- Phytoseius bulgariensis Wainstein, 1969
- Phytoseius bunya Walter & Beard, 1997
- Phytoseius californicus Kennett, 1967
- Phytoseius camelot Walter & Beard, 1997
- Phytoseius campestris Ehara, 1967
- Phytoseius canadensis Chant, 1965
- Phytoseius capitatus Ehara, 1966
- Phytoseius carpineus Wainstein, 1978
- Phytoseius chanti Denmark, 1966
- Phytoseius chinensis Wu & Li, 1982
- Phytoseius ciliatus Wainstein, 1975
- Phytoseius cismontanus De Leon, 1965
- Phytoseius coheni Swirski & Shechter, 1961
- Phytoseius comodera El-Banhawy & Abou-Awad, 1989
- Phytoseius corniger Wainstein, 1959
- Phytoseius corylus Wu, Lan & Zhang, 1992
- Phytoseius cotini Wang & Xu, 1985
- Phytoseius crenatus Ryu, 1993
- Phytoseius crinitus Swirski & Shechter, 1961
- Phytoseius curoatus Chaudhri
- Phytoseius curtisetus Moraes & Mesa, in Moraes, Mesa & Braun 1991
- Phytoseius curvatus Chaudhri, 1973
- Phytoseius dandongensis Lu & Yin, 1992
- Phytoseius danutae Walter & Beard, 1997
- Phytoseius darwin Walter & Beard, 1997
- Phytoseius decoratus Gonzalez & Schuster, 1962
- Phytoseius deleoni Denmark, 1966
- Phytoseius delicatus Chant, 1965
- Phytoseius devildevil Walter & Beard, 1997
- Phytoseius diutius Corpuz-Raros, 1966
- Phytoseius domesticus Rather, 1985
- Phytoseius douglasensis Schicha, 1984
- Phytoseius duplus Ueckermann & Loots, 1985
- Phytoseius echinus Wainstein & Arutunjan, 1970
- Phytoseius ferax Afzal, Akbar & Qayyum, 2000
- Phytoseius ferox Pritchard & Baker, 1962
- Phytoseius flagrum Shahid, Siddiqui & Chaudhri, 1982
- Phytoseius fotheringhamiae Denmark & Schicha, 1975
- Phytoseius fujianensis Wu, 1981
- Phytoseius glareosus Corpuz-Raros, 1966
- Phytoseius guianensis De Leon, 1965
- Phytoseius hawaiiensis Prasad, 1968
- Phytoseius hera Wainstein & Beglyarov, 1972
- Phytoseius hongkongensis Swirski & Shechter, 1961
- Phytoseius hornus Shahid, Siddiqui & Chaudhri, 1982
- Phytoseius horridus Ribaga, 1904
- Phytoseius huaxiensis Xin, Liang & Ke, 1982
- Phytoseius huqiuensis Wu, 1980
- Phytoseius hydrophyllis Poe, 1970
- Phytoseius ikeharai Ehara, 1967
- Phytoseius improcerus Corpuz-Raros, 1966
- Phytoseius incisus Wu & Li, 1984
- Phytoseius indicus Bhattacharyya, 1968
- Phytoseius intermedius Evans & MacFarlane, 1962
- Phytoseius jujuba Gupta, 1977
- Phytoseius juvenis Wainstein & Arutunjan, 1970
- Phytoseius kapuri Gupta, 1969
- Phytoseius kazusanus Ehara, in Ehara, Okada & Kato 1994
- Phytoseius kisumuensis Moraes & McMurtry, in Moraes, McMurtry, van den Berg & Yaninek 1989
- Phytoseius kishii Ehara, 1967
- Phytoseius koreanus Ryu & Ehara, 1991
- Phytoseius latinus El-Banhawy, 1984
- Phytoseius leaki Schicha, 1977
- Phytoseius leonmexicanus (Hirschmann, 1962)
- Phytoseius litchfieldensis Walter & Beard, 1997
- Phytoseius livschitzi Wainstein & Beglyarov, 1972
- Phytoseius longchuanensis Wu, 1997
- Phytoseius longus Wu & Li, 1985
- Phytoseius lyma Shahid, Siddiqui & Chaudhri, 1982
- Phytoseius macropilis (Banks, 1909)
- Phytoseius macrosetosus Gupta, 1977
- Phytoseius maldahaensis Gupta, 1992
- Phytoseius maltshenkovae Wainstein, 1973
- Phytoseius mancus Afzal, Akbar & Qayyum, 2000
- Phytoseius mansehraensis Chaudhri, 1973
- Phytoseius mantecanus De Leon, 1965
- Phytoseius mantoni Walter & Beard, 1997
- Phytoseius marumbus El-Banhawy, 1984
- Phytoseius mayottae Schicha, 1984
- Phytoseius meyerae Gupta, 1977
- Phytoseius mindanensis Schicha & Corpuz-Raros, 1992
- Phytoseius minutus Narayanan, Kaur & Ghai, 1960
- Phytoseius mixtus Chaudhri, 1973
- Phytoseius moderatus Wainstein & Beglyarov, 1972
- Phytoseius montanus De Leon, 1965
- Phytoseius mumafloridanus (Hirschmann, 1962)
- Phytoseius mumai Ehara, 1966
- Phytoseius nahuatlensis De Leon, 1959
- Phytoseius namdaphaensis Gupta, 1986
- Phytoseius neoamba Ueckermann & Loots, 1985
- Phytoseius neocorniger Gupta, 1977
- Phytoseius neoferox Ehara & Bhandhufalck, 1977
- Phytoseius neohongkongensis Moraes & McMurtry, in Moraes, McMurtry, van den Berg & Yaninek 1989
- Phytoseius neomontanus Moraes & McMurtry, in Moraes, McMurtry, van den Berg & Yaninek 1989
- Phytoseius nipponicus Ehara, 1962
- Phytoseius nudus Wu & Li, 1984
- Phytoseius olbios Afzal, Akbar & Qayyum, 2000
- Phytoseius onilahy Blommers, 1976
- Phytoseius oreillyi Walter & Beard, 1997
- Phytoseius orizaba De Leon, 1965
- Phytoseius paludis De Leon, 1965
- Phytoseius paluma Walter & Beard, 1997
- Phytoseius panormita Ragusa & Swirski, 1982
- Phytoseius perforatus El-Badry, 1968
- Phytoseius pernambucanus Moraes & McMurtry, 1983
- Phytoseius pesidiumii Nassar & Kandeel, 1983
- Phytoseius petentis Chaudhri, Akbar & Rasool, 1979
- Phytoseius phenax Afzal, Akbar & Qayyum, 2000
- Phytoseius plumifer (Canestrini & Fanzago, 1876)
- Phytoseius punjabensis Gupta, 1977
- Phytoseius purseglovei De Leon, 1965
- Phytoseius qianshanensis Liang & Ke, 1981
- Phytoseius quercicola Ehara, in Ehara, Okada & Kato 1994
- Phytoseius rachelae Swirski & Shechter, 1961
- Phytoseius rasilis Corpuz-Raros, 1966
- Phytoseius rex De Leon, 1966
- Phytoseius rhabdifer De Leon, 1965
- Phytoseius ribagai Athias-Henriot, in Chant & Athias-Henriot 1960
- Phytoseius rimandoi Corpuz-Raros, 1966
- Phytoseius roseus Gupta, 1969
- Phytoseius rubiginosae Schicha, 1984
- Phytoseius rubii Xin, Liang & Ke, 1982
- Phytoseius rubiphilus Wainstein & Vartapetov, 1972
- Phytoseius rugatus Tseng, 1976
- Phytoseius rugosus Denmark, 1966
- Phytoseius ruidus Wu & Li, 1984
- Phytoseius salicis Wainstein & Arutunjan, 1970
- Phytoseius scabiosus Xin, Liang & Ke, 1983
- Phytoseius scrobis Denmark, 1966
- Phytoseius seungtaii Ryu & Ehara, 1993
- Phytoseius severus Wainstein & Vartapetov, 1972
- Phytoseius shuteri Schicha, 1987
- Phytoseius solanus El-Badry, 1968
- Phytoseius songshanensis Wang & Xu, 1985
- Phytoseius sonunensis Ryu & Ehara, 1993
- Phytoseius spathulatus Chaudhri, 1973
- Phytoseius spoofi (Oudemans, 1915)
- Phytoseius stammeri (Hirschmann, 1962)
- Phytoseius stephaniae Schicha, 1984
- Phytoseius subtilis Wu & Li, 1984
- Phytoseius swirskii Gupta, 1980
- Phytoseius taiyushani Swirski & Shechter, 1961
- Phytoseius tenuiformis Ehara, 1978
- Phytoseius tropicalis Daneshvar, 1987
- Phytoseius turiacus Wainstein & Kolodochka, 1976
- Phytoseius vaginatus Wu, 1983
- Phytoseius venator Khan, Chaudhri & Khan, 1990
- Phytoseius viaticus De Leon, 1967
- Phytoseius wainsteini Gupta, 1981
- Phytoseius wangii Wu & Ou, 1998
- Phytoseius woodburyi De Leon, 1965
- Phytoseius woolwichensis Schicha, 1977
- Phytoseius yuhangensis Yin, Yu, Shi & Yang, 1996
- Phytoseius yunnanensis Lou, Yin & Tong, 1992

- Platyseiella Muma, 1961

- Platyseiella acuta Ehara, 2002
- Platyseiella eliahui Ueckermann, 1992
- Platyseiella longicervicalis (Moraes & Denmark, 1989)
- Platyseiella marikae Ueckermann, 1990
- Platyseiella mumai Ray & Gupta, 1981
- Platyseiella platypilis (Chant, 1959)

== Typhlodrominae ==
Typhlodrominae Scheuten, 1857

- Africoseiulus Chant & McMurtry, 1994

- Africoseiulus namibianus (Ueckermann, 1988)

- Australiseiulus Muma, 1961

- Australiseiulus angophorae (Schicha, 1981)
- Australiseiulus australicus (Womersley, 1954)
- Australiseiulus dewi Beard, 1999
- Australiseiulus goondi Beard, 1999
- Australiseiulus laterisetus Moraes, Oliveira & Zannou, 2001
- Australiseiulus poplar Beard, 1999

- Chanteius Wainstein, 1962

- Chanteius apoensis (Schicha & Corpuz-Raros, 1992)
- Chanteius contiguus (Chant, 1959)
- Chanteius guangdongensis Wu & Lan, 1992
- Chanteius hainanensis Wu & Lan, 1992
- Chanteius makapalus (Schicha & Corpuz-Raros, 1992)
- Chanteius nabiyakus (Schicha & Corpuz-Raros, 1992)
- Chanteius parisukatus (Schicha & Corpuz-Raros, 1992)
- Chanteius separatus (Wu & Li, 1985)
- Chanteius tengi (Wu & Li, 1985)

- Cocoseius Denmark & Andrews, 1981

- Cocoseius elsalvador Denmark & Andrews, 1981
- Cocoseius palmarum Gondim Jr., Moraes & McMurtry, 2000

- Cydnoseius Muma, 1967

- Cydnoseius muntius (Schicha & Corpuz-Raros, 1992)
- Cydnoseius negevi (Swirski & Amitai, 1961)

- Galendromimus Muma, 1961

- Galendromimus alveolaris (De Leon, 1957)
- Galendromimus borinquensis (De Leon, 1965)
- Galendromimus multipoculi Zacarias, Moraes & McMurtry, 2002
- Galendromimus paulista Zacarias & Moraes, 2001
- Galendromimus sanctus De Leon, 1967
- Galendromimus tunapunensis De Leon, 1967

- Galendromus Muma, 1961

- Galendromus annectens (De Leon, 1958)
- Galendromus deceptus (Chant & Yoshida-Shaul, 1984)
- Galendromus ferrugineus De Leon, 1962
- Galendromus helveolus (Chant, 1959)
- Galendromus longipilus (Nesbitt, 1951)
- Galendromus occidentalis (Nesbitt, 1951)
- Galendromus pilosus (Chant, 1959)
- Galendromus porresi (McMurtry, 1983)
- Galendromus superstus Zack, 1969
- Galendromus carinulatus (De Leon, 1959)
- Galendromus hondurensis Denmark & Evans, in Denmark, Evans, Aguilar, Vargas & Ochoa 1999
- Galendromus pinnatus (Schuster & Pritchard, 1963)
- Galendromus reticulus Tuttle & Muma, 1973

- Gigagnathus Chant, 1965

- Gigagnathus extendus Chant, 1965

- Kuzinellus Wainstein, 1976

- Kuzinellus acanthus (van der Merwe, 1968)
- Kuzinellus additionalis Kolodochka, 1993
- Kuzinellus aditus (Parvez, Chaudhri & Ashfaq, 1994)
- Kuzinellus andreae [in subgenus Anthoseius]
- Kuzinellus blairi (McMurtry & Moraes, 1991)
- Kuzinellus bregetovae (Wainstein & Beglyarov, 1972)
- Kuzinellus ecclesiasticus (De Leon, 1958)
- Kuzinellus elhariri (Bayan, 1988)
- Kuzinellus febriculus (Ueckermann & Loots, 1984)
- Kuzinellus ignavus (Chaudhri, Akbar & Rassol, 1974)
- Kuzinellus kuzini (Wainstein, 1962)
- Kuzinellus loricatus Wainstein, 1978
- Kuzinellus meritus (Parvez, Chaudhri & Ashfaq, 1994)
- Kuzinellus neosentus (van der Merwe, 1968)
- Kuzinellus neosoleiger (Gupta, 1981)
- Kuzinellus niloticus (El-Badry, 1967)
- Kuzinellus obsis (Ueckermann & Loots, 1988)
- Kuzinellus operantis (Chaudhri, Akbar & Rassol, 1974)
- Kuzinellus parvus (Denmark & Matthysse, in Matthysse & Denmark 1981)
- Kuzinellus prunusus (van der Merwe, 1968)
- Kuzinellus querellus (Ueckermann & Loots, 1988)
- Kuzinellus relentus (Denmark & Matthysse, in Matthysse & Denmark 1981)
- Kuzinellus saharae McMurtry & Bounfour, 1989
- Kuzinellus scytinus (Chazeau, 1970)
- Kuzinellus sennarensis (El-Badry, 1967)
- Kuzinellus sentus (Pritchard & Baker, 1962)
- Kuzinellus sursum (Parvez, Chaudhri & Ashfaq, 1994)
- Kuzinellus torulosus Kuznetsov, 1994
- Kuzinellus trisetus (Wu, Lan & Zhang, 1992)
- Kuzinellus vitreus (Chaudhri, Akbar & Rassol, 1974)
- Kuzinellus wentzeli (Ueckermann & Loots, 1988)
- Kuzinellus yokogawae (Ehara & Hamaoka, 1980)

- Leonseius Chant & McMurtry, 1994

- Leonseius regularis (De Leon, 1965)

- Metaseiulus Muma, 1961

- Metaseiulus denmarki (Chant & Yoshida-Shaul, 1984)
- Metaseiulus luculentis (De Leon, 1959)
- Metaseiulus serratus (Tuttle & Muma, 1973)
- Metaseiulus adjacentis (De Leon, 1959)
- Metaseiulus arboreus (Chant, 1957)
- Metaseiulus anchialus (Kennett, 1958)
- Metaseiulus arceuthobius (Kennett, 1963)
- Metaseiulus bidentatus (Denmark & Evans, in Denmark, Evans, Aguilar, Vargas & Ochoa 1999)
- Metaseiulus bisoni (Chant & Yoshida-Shaul, 1984)
- Metaseiulus brevicollis Gonzalez & Schuster, 1962
- Metaseiulus bromus (Denmark, 1982)
- Metaseiulus camelliae (Chant & Yoshida-Shaul, 1983)
- Metaseiulus citri (Garman & McGregor, 1956)
- Metaseiulus cornus (De Leon, 1957)
- Metaseiulus deleoni (Hirschmann, 1962)
- Metaseiulus edwardi (Chant & Yoshida-Shaul, 1983)
- Metaseiulus eiko (El-Banhawy, 1984)
- Metaseiulus ellipticus (De Leon, 1958)
- Metaseiulus flumenis (Chant, 1957)
- Metaseiulus gramina (Tuttle & Muma, 1973)
- Metaseiulus greeneae (Denmark & Muma, 1967)
- Metaseiulus herbertae (Nesbitt, 1951)
- Metaseiulus johnsoni (Mahr, 1979)
- Metaseiulus juniperoides (De Leon, 1962)
- Metaseiulus lindquisti (Chant & Yoshida-Shaul, 1984)
- Metaseiulus mahri (Chant & Yoshida-Shaul, 1984)
- Metaseiulus mexicanus (Muma, 1963)
- Metaseiulus negundinis (Denmark, 1982)
- Metaseiulus nelsoni (Chant, 1959)
- Metaseiulus neoflumenis Moraes & Kreiter, in Moraes, Kreiter & Lofego 2000
- Metaseiulus paraflumenis (Chant & Yoshida-Shaul, 1984)
- Metaseiulus pedoni (Zaher & Shehata, 1969)
- Metaseiulus pini (Chant, 1955)
- Metaseiulus plumipilis (Denmark, 1994)
- Metaseiulus pomi (Parrott, 1906)
- Metaseiulus pomoides Schuster & Pritchard, 1963
- Metaseiulus profitai (Denmark, 1994)
- Metaseiulus smithi (Schuster, 1957)
- Metaseiulus tuttlei (Denmark, 1982)
- Metaseiulus valentii (Denmark, 1994)
- Metaseiulus validus (Chant, 1957)

- Meyerius van der Merwe, 1968

- Meyerius agrostidis (van der Merwe, 1968)
- Meyerius chaetopus (van der Merwe, 1968)
- Meyerius citimus (van der Merwe, 1968)
- Meyerius collativus (van der Merwe, 1968)
- Meyerius convallis (van der Merwe, 1968)
- Meyerius egregius (van der Merwe, 1968)
- Meyerius fistella (Ueckermann & Loots, 1984)
- Meyerius heindrichi (Ueckermann & Loots, 1984)
- Meyerius immutatus (van der Merwe, 1968)
- Meyerius incisus (van der Merwe, 1968)
- Meyerius keetchi (Ueckermann & Loots, 1984)
- Meyerius latus (van der Merwe, 1968)
- Meyerius liliaceus (van der Merwe, 1968)
- Meyerius litus (Ueckermann & Loots, 1984)
- Meyerius maritimus (van der Merwe, 1968)
- Meyerius veretillum (van der Merwe, 1968)
- Meyerius zantedeschiae (van der Merwe, 1968)

- Neoseiulella Muma, 1961

- Neoseiulella aceri (Collyer, 1957)
- Neoseiulella armidalensis (Schicha & Elshafie, 1980)
- Neoseiulella arutunjani (Kuznetsov, 1984)
- Neoseiulella ashleyae (Chant & Yoshida-Shaul, 1989)
- Neoseiulella canariensis Ferragut & Pena-Estevez, 2003
- Neoseiulella carmeli (Rivnay & Swirski, 1980)
- Neoseiulella cassiniae (Collyer, 1982)
- Neoseiulella celtis Denmark & Rather, 1996
- Neoseiulella compta (Corpuz-Raros, 1966)
- Neoseiulella coreen Walter, 1997
- Neoseiulella corrugata (Schicha, 1983)
- Neoseiulella cottieri (Collyer, 1964)
- Neoseiulella crassipilis (Athias-Henriot & Fauvel, 1981)
- Neoseiulella dachanti (Collyer, 1964)
- Neoseiulella elaeocarpi (Schicha, 1993)
- Neoseiulella eleglidus (Tseng, 1983)
- Neoseiulella elongata Ferragut & Pena-Estevez, 2003
- Neoseiulella litoralis (Swirski & Amitai, 1984)
- Neoseiulella manukae (Collyer, 1964)
- Neoseiulella montforti (Rivnay & Swirski, 1980)
- Neoseiulella myopori (Collyer, 1982)
- Neoseiulella nesbitti (Womersley, 1954)
- Neoseiulella novaezealandiae (Collyer, 1964)
- Neoseiulella oleariae (Collyer, 1982)
- Neoseiulella perforata (Athias-Henriot, 1960)
- Neoseiulella runiacus (Kolodochka, 1980)
- Neoseiulella schusteri (Yousef & El-Brollosy, 1986)
- Neoseiulella spaini (Collyer, 1982)
- Neoseiulella splendida Ferragut & Pena-Estevez, 2003
- Neoseiulella steeli (Schicha & McMurtry, 1986)
- Neoseiulella steveni (Schicha, 1987)
- Neoseiulella tiliarum (Oudemans, 1930)
- Neoseiulella tuberculata (Wainstein, 1958)
- Neoseiulella vollsella (Chaudhri, Akbar & Rassol, 1974)

- Papuaseius Chant & McMurtry, 1994

- Papuaseius dominiquae (Schicha & Gutierrez, 1985)

- Paraseiulus Muma, 1961

- Paraseiulus deogyuensis (Ryu & Ehara, 1990)
- Paraseiulus erevanicus Wainstein & Arutunjan, 1967
- Paraseiulus inobservatus Kolodochka, 1983
- Paraseiulus insignis Kolodochka, 1983
- Paraseiulus intermixtus Kolodochka, 1983
- Paraseiulus jirofticus Daneshvar, 1987
- Paraseiulus minutus Athias-Henriot, 1978
- Paraseiulus porosus Kolodochka, 1980
- Paraseiulus soleiger (Ribaga, 1904)
- Paraseiulus talbii (Athias-Henriot, 1960)
- Paraseiulus triporus (Chant & Yoshida-Shaul, 1982)
- Paraseiulus yugoslavicus (Mijuskovic & Tomasevic, 1975)

- Silvaseius Chant & McMurtry, 1994

- Silvaseius barretoae (Yoshida-Shaul & Chant, 1991)

- Typhlodromina Muma, 1961

- Typhlodromina conspicua (Garman, 1948)
- Typhlodromina eharai Muma & Denmark, 1969
- Typhlodromina musero (Schicha, 1987)
- Typhlodromina subtropica Muma & Denmark, 1969
- Typhlodromina tropica (Chant, 1959)

- Typhlodromus Scheuten, 1857

- Typhlodromus acacia Xin, Liang & Ke, 1980
- Typhlodromus acaciae Schultz, 1973
- Typhlodromus adenensis Ueckermann, 1996
- Typhlodromus admirabilis (Wainstein, 1978)
- Typhlodromus aenaulus Ueckermann, 1996
- Typhlodromus aestivalis Athias-Henriot, 1960
- Typhlodromus agilis (Chaudhri, 1975)
- Typhlodromus ailanthi Wang & Xu, 1985
- Typhlodromus aktherecus (Kolodochka, 1979)
- Typhlodromus algonquinensis Chant, Hansell & Yoshida-Shaul, 1974
- Typhlodromus apoxys van der Merwe, 1968
- Typhlodromus applegum Schicha, 1983
- Typhlodromus argyronamus Ueckermann & Loots, 1988
- Typhlodromus arizonicus (Tuttle & Muma, 1973)
- Typhlodromus arunachalensis Gupta, 1986
- Typhlodromus astibus Ueckermann & Loots, 1984
- Typhlodromus asticus El-Banhawy & Abou-Awad, 1991
- Typhlodromus athenas Swirski & Ragusa, 1976
- Typhlodromus auratus Ueckermann & Loots, 1988
- Typhlodromus bagdasarjani Wainstein & Arutunjan, 1967
- Typhlodromus bakeri (Garman, 1948)
- Typhlodromus balakotiensis (Chaudhri, Akbar & Rasool, 1974)
- Typhlodromus balanites El-Badry, 1967
- Typhlodromus bambusae Ehara, 1964
- Typhlodromus bambusicolus Gupta, 1977
- Typhlodromus banahawensis Schicha & Corpuz-Raros, 1992
- Typhlodromus bergi Moraes & McMurtry, 1988
- Typhlodromus beskaravainyi (Kuznetsov, 1984)
- Typhlodromus betulae (Kolodochka, 1992)
- Typhlodromus bifurcuta Wu, 1983
- Typhlodromus bondarenkoi (Arutunjan, 1973)
- Typhlodromus borealis Ehara, 1967
- Typhlodromus brevimedius Wu & Liu, 1991
- Typhlodromus brisbanensis Schicha, 1978
- Typhlodromus buccalis van der Merwe, 1968
- Typhlodromus bullatus van der Merwe, 1968
- Typhlodromus cannabis Ke & Xin, 1983
- Typhlodromus capparidis van der Merwe, 1968
- Typhlodromus caucasicus (Abbasova, 1970)
- Typhlodromus caudiglans Schuster, 1959
- Typhlodromus celastrus Ueckermann & Loots, 1988
- Typhlodromus cephalochaitosus Moraes, Oliveira & Zannou, 2001
- Typhlodromus cerasicolus (Wainstein & Vartapetov, 1972)
- Typhlodromus cervix Wu & Li, 1984
- Typhlodromus changi Tseng, 1975
- Typhlodromus channabasavannai Gupta, 1978
- Typhlodromus chanti Hirschmann, 1962
- Typhlodromus charactus Ueckermann, 1996
- Typhlodromus chazeaui Blommers, 1973
- Typhlodromus chinensis Ehara & Lee, 1971
- Typhlodromus chrysanthemi Gupta, 1977
- Typhlodromus clairathiasae Wainstein & Arutunjan, 1967
- Typhlodromus combretum McMurtry & Moraes, 1991
- Typhlodromus commenticius Livshitz & Kuznetsov, 1972
- Typhlodromus communis Gupta, 1980
- Typhlodromus concavus Wang & Xu, 1991
- Typhlodromus coniferculus (Wainstein, 1978)
- Typhlodromus coryli Wu & Lan, 1991
- Typhlodromus coryphus Wu, 1985
- Typhlodromus crassus van der Merwe, 1968
- Typhlodromus cuii Wu & Ou, 1998
- Typhlodromus dactylifera (Chaudhri, Akbar & Rasool, 1974)
- Typhlodromus dalfardicus (Daneshvar, 1987)
- Typhlodromus dalii (Rather, 1984)
- Typhlodromus daresalaami El-Banhawy & Abou-Awad, 1991
- Typhlodromus darjeelingensis Gupta, 1986
- Typhlodromus dasiphorae Wu & Lan, 1991
- Typhlodromus datongensis Wang & Xu, 1991
- Typhlodromus deleoni (Denmark & Muma, 1975)
- Typhlodromus denarus Schicha & Corpuz-Raros, 1992
- Typhlodromus denmarki (Rather, 1984)
- Typhlodromus diumbokus Schicha & Corpuz-Raros, 1992
- Typhlodromus divergentis (Chaudhri, Akbar & Rasool, 1974)
- Typhlodromus doreenae Schicha, 1987
- Typhlodromus dossei Schicha, 1978
- Typhlodromus drori Grinberg & Amitai, 1970
- Typhlodromus drymis Ueckermann & Loots, 1988
- Typhlodromus eddiei Ueckermann & Loots, 1988
- Typhlodromus egypticus El-Badry, 1967
- Typhlodromus elisae Schicha & McMurtry, 1986
- Typhlodromus elmassri Bayan, 1988
- Typhlodromus eremicus Ueckermann, in Meyer & Ueckermann 1989
- Typhlodromus eremitidis (Chaudhri, Akbar & Rassol, 1974)
- Typhlodromus evectus (Schuster, 1966)
- Typhlodromus februs van der Merwe, 1968
- Typhlodromus fleschneri Chant, 1960
- Typhlodromus foenilis Oudemans, 1930
- Typhlodromus foraminosus (Schuster, 1966)
- Typhlodromus fujianensis Wu & Liu, 1991
- Typhlodromus galummatus (Chaudhri, Akbar & Rassol, 1974)
- Typhlodromus gardeniae Schultz, 1973
- Typhlodromus garhwalicus Gupta, 1982
- Typhlodromus georgicus Wainstein, 1958
- Typhlodromus ghanii (Muma, 1967)
- Typhlodromus gopali Gupta, 1969
- Typhlodromus gouaniae Schicha, 1983
- Typhlodromus gracilentus Tseng, 1975
- Typhlodromus grastis Ueckermann & Loots, 1988
- Typhlodromus gressitti McMurtry & Moraes, 1985
- Typhlodromus guangdongensis Wu & Lan, 1994
- Typhlodromus guangxiensis Wu, Lan & Zeng, 1997
- Typhlodromus gulingensis Zhu, 1985
- Typhlodromus gutierrezi Blommers, 1973
- Typhlodromus hadii Chaudhri, 1965
- Typhlodromus kashmiricus Gupta, 1981
- Typhlodromus hadzhievi (Abbasova, 1970)
- Typhlodromus haiastanius (Arutunjan, 1977)
- Typhlodromus halinae (Wainstein & Kolodochka, 1974)
- Typhlodromus haramotoi Prasad, 1968
- Typhlodromus hartlandrowei Evans, 1958
- Typhlodromus hebetis (De Leon, 1959)
- Typhlodromus hibernus Wang & Xu, 1991
- Typhlodromus higoensis Ehara, 1985
- Typhlodromus himalayensis Gupta, 1981
- Typhlodromus hirashimai Ehara, 1972
- Typhlodromus homalii Gupta, 1970
- Typhlodromus hui Wu, 1987
- Typhlodromus hungaricus Bozai, 1997
- Typhlodromus ilicis Athias-Henriot, 1960
- Typhlodromus incasus (Chaudhri, 1975)
- Typhlodromus incertus Athias-Henriot, 1960
- Typhlodromus incisivus van der Merwe, 1968
- Typhlodromus inopinatus (Wainstein, 1975)
- Typhlodromus inops (De Leon, 1967)
- Typhlodromus insularis Ehara, 1966
- Typhlodromus intercalaris Livshitz & Kuznetsov, 1972
- Typhlodromus intermedius Wu, 1988
- Typhlodromus invectus Chant, 1959
- Typhlodromus involutus Livshitz & Kuznetsov, 1972
- Typhlodromus iranensis (Denmark & Daneshvar, 1982)
- Typhlodromus johannae Ueckermann & Loots, 1988
- Typhlodromus jordanis (Rivnay & Swirski, 1980)
- Typhlodromus kadonoi Ehara, in Ehara, Okada & Kato 1994
- Typhlodromus kazachstanicus Wainstein, 1958
- Typhlodromus kazimiae (Denmark & Muma, 1978)
- Typhlodromus kerkirae Swirski & Ragusa, 1976
- Typhlodromus khosrovensis Arutunjan, 1971
- Typhlodromus yphlodromus (kikuyuensis Swirski & Ragusa, 1978)
- Typhlodromus kiso Ehara, 1972
- Typhlodromus kodaikanalensis Gupta, 1978
- Typhlodromus kolodochkai (Denmark & Welbourn, 2002)
- Typhlodromus krimbasi Papadoulis & Emmanouel, 1997
- Typhlodromus kutabus Schicha & Corpuz-Raros, 1992
- Typhlodromus kuznetsovi (Denmark & Welbourn, 2002)
- Typhlodromus lalazariensis (Chaudhri, 1975)
- Typhlodromus lanyuensis Tseng, 1975
- Typhlodromus lataniae El-Badry, 1968
- Typhlodromus lateris Wu, Lan & Liu, 1995
- Typhlodromus libitus (Chaudhri, 1975)
- Typhlodromus limitatus (Chaudhri, Akbar & Rasool, 1979)
- Typhlodromus linzhiensis Wu, 1987
- Typhlodromus longa (Denmark & Knisley, 1978)
- Typhlodromus longicervix Wu & Liu, 1997
- Typhlodromus lootsi Schultz, 1972
- Typhlodromus loralaiana (Muma, 1967)
- Typhlodromus lushanensis Zhu, 1985
- Typhlodromus luzonensis Schicha & Corpuz-Raros, 1992
- Typhlodromus machaon (Wainstein, 1977)
- Typhlodromus macroides Zhu, 1985
- Typhlodromus macrum Ke & Xin, 1983
- Typhlodromus majumderi Gupta, 1986
- Typhlodromus malicolus Wainstein & Arutunjan, 1967
- Typhlodromus mangiferus Zaher & El-Brollosy, in Zaher 1986
- Typhlodromus manipurensis Gupta, 1977
- Typhlodromus maracus (Chaudhri, 1975)
- Typhlodromus marinus Wu & Liu, 1991
- Typhlodromus maspalomensis Ferragut & Pena-Estevez, 2003
- Typhlodromus matthyssei Ueckermann & Loots, 1988
- Typhlodromus meerutensis (Ghai & Menon, 1969)
- Typhlodromus meritus (Wainstein, 1978)
- Typhlodromus mesasiaticus Wainstein, 1962
- Typhlodromus michaeli Ueckermann & Loots, 1988
- Typhlodromus microbullatus van der Merwe, 1968
- Typhlodromus miyarai Ehara, 1967
- Typhlodromus monosetus Wang & Xu, 1991
- Typhlodromus montanus Chant & Yoshida-Shaul, 1978
- Typhlodromus mori Gupta, 1981
- Typhlodromus muliebris van der Merwe, 1968
- Typhlodromus namaquaensis Ueckermann & Loots, 1988
- Typhlodromus ndibu Pritchard & Baker, 1962
- Typhlodromus neobakeri Prasad, 1968
- Typhlodromus neocrassus Tseng, 1983
- Typhlodromus neorhenanus Gupta, 1977
- Typhlodromus neotransvaalensis Gupta, 1978
- Typhlodromus neyshabouris (Denmark & Daneshvar, 1982)
- Typhlodromus nilgiriensis Gupta, 1986
- Typhlodromus nobilis (Kuznetsov, 1984)
- Typhlodromus oasis El-Badry, 1968
- Typhlodromus obesus Tseng, 1983
- Typhlodromus occiduus (Karg, 1990)
- Typhlodromus octavus (Chaudhri, Akbar & Rassol, 1974)
- Typhlodromus ordinatur (Kuznetsov, 1984)
- Typhlodromus orientalis Wu, 1981
- Typhlodromus orissaensis Gupta, 1977
- Typhlodromus ornatulus (Chaudhri, 1975)
- Typhlodromus ornata (Denmark & Muma, 1973)
- Typhlodromus paganus van der Merwe, 1968
- Typhlodromus paraevectus Moraes & McMurtry, 1983
- Typhlodromus parinopinatus (Evans & Edland, 1998)
- Typhlodromus pegazzani Ragusa & Swirski, 1978
- Typhlodromus persianus McMurtry, 1977
- Typhlodromus persicus Gupta, 1992
- Typhlodromus philippinensis Corpuz-Raros, 1966
- Typhlodromus pineus Wu & Li, 1984
- Typhlodromus pirianykae (Wainstein, 1972)
- Typhlodromus platycladus Xin, Liang & Ke, 1980
- Typhlodromus ponticus (Kolodochka, 1992)
- Typhlodromus porathi Swirski & Amitai, 1967
- Typhlodromus porus Wu, 1988
- Typhlodromus povtari (Kolodochka, 1988)
- Typhlodromus praeacutus van der Merwe, 1968
- Typhlodromus pruni Gupta, 1970
- Typhlodromus pseudoserrulatus Tseng, 1983
- Typhlodromus psyllakisi Swirski & Ragusa, 1976
- Typhlodromus qianshanensis Wu, 1988
- Typhlodromus quadratoides Wu & Liu, 1997
- Typhlodromus quadratus Wu & Liu, 1997
- Typhlodromus rapidus Wainstein & Arutunjan, 1968
- Typhlodromus rasilis van der Merwe, 1968
- Typhlodromus recki Wainstein, 1958
- Typhlodromus religiosus Ueckermann & Loots, 1988
- Typhlodromus repens (Beglyarov, 1981)
- Typhlodromus rhenanus (Oudemans, 1905)
- Typhlodromus rhenanoides Athias-Henriot, 1960
- Typhlodromus rhododendroni Gupta, 1978
- Typhlodromus ribei Ke & Xin, 1983
- Typhlodromus richteri Karg, 1970
- Typhlodromus rickeri Chant, 1960
- Typhlodromus rivulus (Karg, 1991)
- Typhlodromus rodriguezi (Denmark & Daneshvar, 1982)
- Typhlodromus rubetum (Wainstein, 1972)
- Typhlodromus ryukyuensis Ehara, 1967
- Typhlodromus saevus van der Merwe, 1968
- Typhlodromus salviae (Kolodochka, 1979)
- Typhlodromus samliensis (Chaudhri, 1975)
- Typhlodromus sapiens Athias-Henriot, 1960
- Typhlodromus serratosus El-Halawany & Abdel-Samad, 1990
- Typhlodromus serratus (Chaudhri, 1975)
- Typhlodromus serrulatus Ehara, 1972
- Typhlodromus shibai Ehara, 1981
- Typhlodromus sica (Chaudhri, Akbar & Rassol, 1974)
- Typhlodromus sijiensis Gupta, 1986
- Typhlodromus silvanus Ehara & Kishimoto, in Ehara, Okada & Kato 1994
- Typhlodromus singularis Chant, 1957
- Typhlodromus sonprayagensis Gupta, 1985
- Typhlodromus spectatus (Kolodochka, 1992)
- Typhlodromus spiralis (Wainstein & Kolodochka, 1974)
- Typhlodromus subarcticus Chant, Hansell & Yoshida-Shaul, 1974
- Typhlodromus subequalis Wu, 1988
- Typhlodromus submarinus Wu, Lan & Zeng, 1997
- Typhlodromus sudanicus El-Badry, 1967
- Typhlodromus suecicus (Sellnick, 1958)
- Typhlodromus sycomorus Zaher & Shehata, 1969
- Typhlodromus taishanensis Wang & Xu, 1985
- Typhlodromus tamaricis (Kolodochka, 1982)
- Typhlodromus tardus (Kuznetsov, 1984)
- Typhlodromus tecoma (Denmark & Evans, 1999)
- Typhlodromus tenuis (Kuznetsov, 1984)
- Typhlodromus ternatus Ehara, 1972
- Typhlodromus terrulentis van der Merwe, 1968
- Typhlodromus thailandicus Ehara & Bhandhufalck, 1977
- Typhlodromus theroni Ueckermann & Loots, 1988
- Typhlodromus thesbites (Swirski & Amitai, 1997)
- Typhlodromus torbatejamae (Denmark & Daneshvar, 1982)
- Typhlodromus totifolianensis El-Banhawy & Abou-Awad, 1991
- Typhlodromus transvaalensis (Nesbitt, 1951)
- Typhlodromus tridentiger Tseng, 1975
- Typhlodromus ulmi Wang & Xu, 1985
- Typhlodromus umbraculus Ueckermann & Loots, 1988
- Typhlodromus umbratus (Chaudhri, Akbar & Rassol, 1974)
- Typhlodromus verbenae Wu & Lan, 1994
- Typhlodromus vescus van der Merwe, 1968
- Typhlodromus viniferae (Rather, 1987)
- Typhlodromus votivus (Meshkov, 1990)
- Typhlodromus vulgaris Ehara, 1959
- Typhlodromus xingchengensis Wu, Lan & Zhang, 1992
- Typhlodromus xini Wu, 1983
- Typhlodromus xinjiangensis Wu & Li, 1987
- Typhlodromus xiufui Wu & Liu, 1997
- Typhlodromus xizangensis Wu & Lan, 1994
- Typhlodromus wainsteini (Abbasova, 1970)
- Typhlodromus werneri Schultz, 1973
- Typhlodromus wichmanni Hirschmann, 1962
- Typhlodromus wonkooi Ryu & Ehara, 1992
- Typhlodromus wrenschae Ueckermann & Loots, 1988
- Typhlodromus yamashitai Ehara, 1972
- Typhlodromus yasumatsui Ehara, 1966
- Typhlodromus yinchuanensis Liang & Hu, 1988
- Typhlodromus zafari Chaudhri, 1965
- Typhlodromus zhangyensis Wang & Xu, 1991
- Typhlodromus zhaoi Wu & Li, 1983
- Typhlodromus accessorius Kolodochka, 1993
- Typhlodromus americanus Chant & Yoshida-Shaul, 1989
- Typhlodromus andrei Karg, 1982
- Typhlodromus armiger Ehara & Amano, 1998
- Typhlodromus athiasae Porath & Swirski, 1965
- Typhlodromus atticus Swirski & Ragusa, 1976
- Typhlodromus baccettii Lombardini, 1960
- Typhlodromus beglarovi Kuznetsov, 1984
- Typhlodromus bichaetae Karg, 1989
- Typhlodromus confusus Narayanan, Kaur & Ghai, 1960
- Typhlodromus corticis Herbert, 1958
- Typhlodromus rodovae Wainstein & Arutunjan, 1968
- Typhlodromus cotoneastri Wainstein, 1961
- Typhlodromus ernesti Ragusa & Swirski, 1978
- Typhlodromus griekwensis Schultz, 1973
- Typhlodromus inhabilis Kuznetsov, 1984
- Typhlodromus kadii Kandeel & El-Halawany, 1985
- Typhlodromus klimenkoi Kolodochka, 1980
- Typhlodromus knisleyi Denmark, 1992
- Typhlodromus kykladiticus Papadoulis & Emmanouel, 1993
- Typhlodromus laurae Arutunjan, 1974
- Typhlodromus leptodactylus Wainstein, 1961
- Typhlodromus longipalpus Swirski & Ragusa, 1976
- Typhlodromus magdalenae Pritchard & Baker, 1962
- Typhlodromus morellensis Ferragut, 1991
- Typhlodromus moroccoensis Denmark, 1992
- Typhlodromus norvegicus Edland & Evans, 1998
- Typhlodromus olympicus Papadoulis & Emmanouel, 1993
- Typhlodromus pentelicus Papadoulis & Emmanouel, 1990
- Typhlodromus personatus Karg, 1989
- Typhlodromus phialatus Athias-Henriot, 1960
- Typhlodromus phylaktioticus Papadoulis & Emmanouel, 1990
- Typhlodromus pseudopyri Ehara & Amano, 1998
- Typhlodromus pyri Scheuten, 1857
- Typhlodromus quercicolus Denmark, 1992
- Typhlodromus rarus Wainstein, 1961
- Typhlodromus roshanlali Narayanan & Ghai, 1963
- Typhlodromus sapphicus Ragusa & Tsolakis, 1998
- Typhlodromus setubali Dosse, 1961
- Typhlodromus swirskii Denmark, 1992
- Typhlodromus tiliae Oudemans, 1929
- Typhlodromus tubifer Wainstein, 1961
- Typhlodromus zaheri Denmark, 1992

- Typhloseiopsis De Leon, 1959

- Typhloseiopsis funiculatus De Leon, 1965
- Typhloseiopsis maryae McMurtry, 1983
- Typhloseiopsis neopritchardi Moraes & Mesa, 1988
- Typhloseiopsis pritchardi (Chant & Baker, 1965)
- Typhloseiopsis theodoliticus De Leon, 1959

- Typhloseiulus Chant & McMurtry, 1994

- Typhloseiulus arzakanicus (Arutunjan, 1972)
- Typhloseiulus calabriae (Ragusa & Swirski, 1976)
- Typhloseiulus carmonae (Chant & Yoshida-Shaul, 1983)
- Typhloseiulus eleonorae (Ragusa & Swirski, 1981)
- Typhloseiulus eliahuswirskii (Ragusa Di Chiara, 1992)
- Typhloseiulus erymanthii (Papadoulis & Emmanouel, 1988)
- Typhloseiulus peculiaris (Kolodochka, 1980)
- Typhloseiulus rodopiensis (Papadoulis & Emmanouel, 1994)
- Typhloseiulus simplex (Chant, 1956)
- Typhloseiulus subsimplex (Arutunjan, 1972)
