= P. domesticus =

P. domesticus may refer to:

- Passer domesticus, the house sparrow, a bird species
- Phytoseius domesticus, Rather, 1985, a mite species in the genus Phytoseius and the family Phytoseiidae
- Prodidomus domesticus, Lessert, 1938, a spider species in the genus Prodidomus and the family Prodidomidae found in Congo

== See also ==
- Domesticus (disambiguation)
