= Arrenoseius =

Scientific classification
- Kingdom: Animalia
- Phylum: Arthropoda
- Subphylum: Chelicerata
- Class: Arachnida
- Order: Mesostigmata
- Family: Phytoseiidae
- Subfamily: Amblyseiinae
- Genus: Arrenoseius; Wainstein, 1962

Genus of mites

Arrenoseius is a genus of mites in the Phytoseiidae family.

== Species ==
- Arrenoseius palustris (Chant, 1960)
