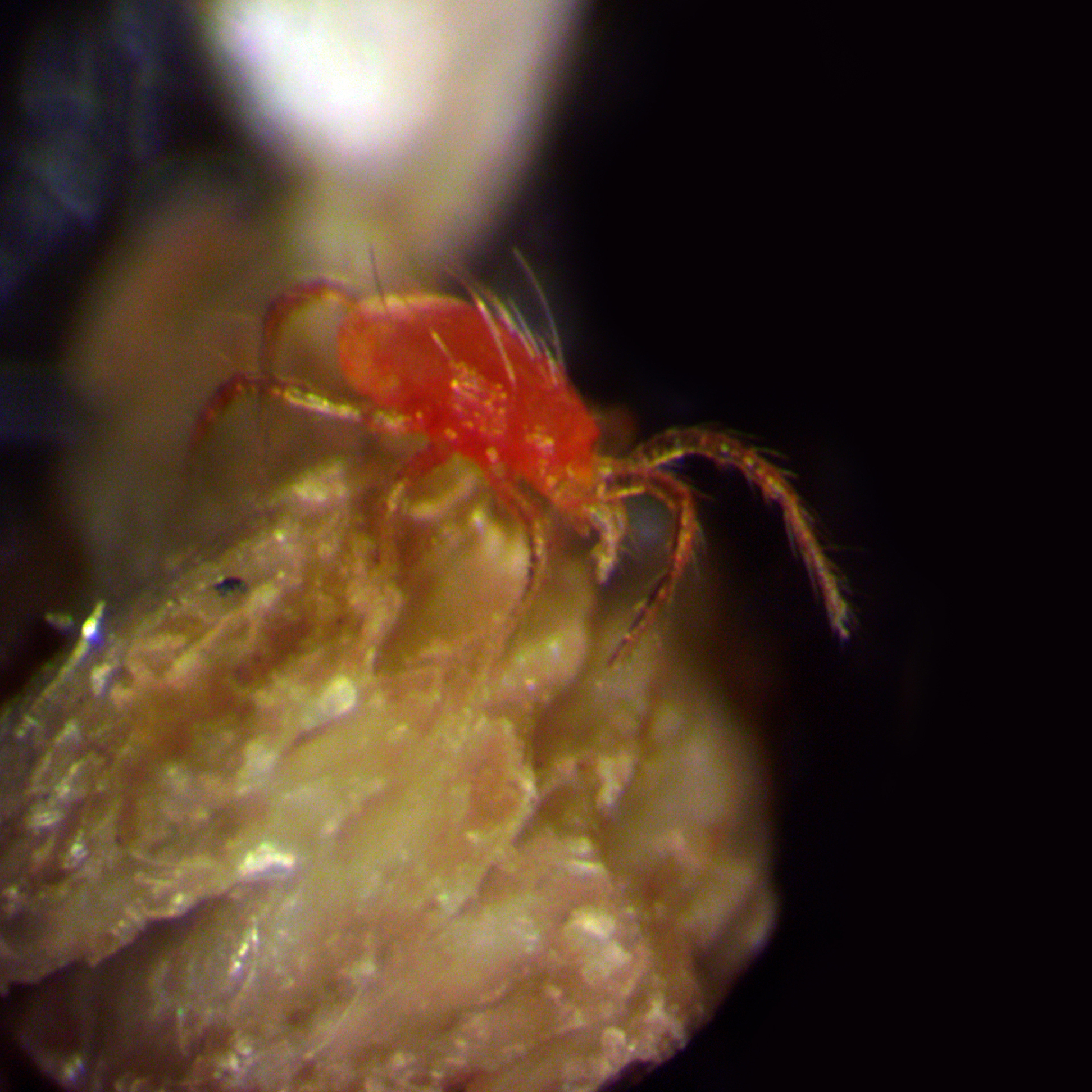
- Phytoseiulus persimilis on a piece of vermiculite

Scientific classification
- Kingdom: Animalia
- Phylum: Arthropoda
- Subphylum: Chelicerata
- Class: Arachnida
- Order: Mesostigmata
- Family: Phytoseiidae
- Subfamily: Amblyseiinae
- Genus: Phytoseiulus; Evans, 1952

= Phytoseiulus =

Genus of mites

Phytoseiulus is a genus of mites in the Phytoseiidae family.

The species Phytoseiulus persimilis is a predatory mite, and is used for biological control of two-spotted spider mites.

== Species ==
The genus Phytoseiulus contains these species:

- Phytoseiulus fragariae Denmark & Schicha, 1983
- Phytoseiulus longipes Evans, 1958
- Phytoseiulus macropilis (Banks, 1904)
- Phytoseiulus persimilis Athias-Henriot, 1957 [synonymy: Phytoseiulus riegeli Dosse, 1958; Phytoseiulus tardi (Lombardini, 1959)]
- Phytoseiulus robertsi (Baker, 1990)
