= Amblyseiella =

Scientific classification
- Kingdom: Animalia
- Phylum: Arthropoda
- Subphylum: Chelicerata
- Class: Arachnida
- Order: Mesostigmata
- Family: Phytoseiidae
- Subfamily: Amblyseiinae
- Genus: Amblyseiella; Muma, 1955

Genus of mites

Amblyseiella is a genus of mites in the Phytoseiidae family.

== Species ==
- Amblyseiella denmarki (Zaher & El-Brollosy, 1986)
- Amblyseiella rusticana (Athias-Henriot, 1960)
- Amblyseiella setosa Muma, 1955
