= Parakampimodromus =

Scientific classification
- Kingdom: Animalia
- Phylum: Arthropoda
- Subphylum: Chelicerata
- Class: Arachnida
- Order: Mesostigmata
- Family: Phytoseiidae
- Subfamily: Amblyseiinae
- Genus: Parakampimodromus; Chant & McMurtry, 2003

Genus of mites

Parakampimodromus is a genus of mites in the Phytoseiidae family.

== Species ==
- Parakampimodromus trichophilus (Blommers, 1976)
