= Evansoseius =

Scientific classification
- Kingdom: Animalia
- Phylum: Arthropoda
- Subphylum: Chelicerata
- Class: Arachnida
- Order: Mesostigmata
- Family: Phytoseiidae
- Subfamily: Amblyseiinae
- Genus: Evansoseius; Sheals, 1962

Genus of mites

Evansoseius is a genus of mites in the Phytoseiidae family.

== Species ==
- Evansoseius macfarlanei Sheals, 1962
