= Iphiseius =

Scientific classification
- Kingdom: Animalia
- Phylum: Arthropoda
- Subphylum: Chelicerata
- Class: Arachnida
- Order: Mesostigmata
- Family: Phytoseiidae
- Subfamily: Amblyseiinae
- Genus: Iphiseius; Berlese, 1921

Genus of mites

Iphiseius is a genus of mites in the Phytoseiidae family.

== Species ==
- Iphiseius degenerans (Berlese, 1889)
- Iphiseius martigellus El-Badry, 1968
