= Pholaseius =

Scientific classification
- Kingdom: Animalia
- Phylum: Arthropoda
- Subphylum: Chelicerata
- Class: Arachnida
- Order: Mesostigmata
- Family: Phytoseiidae
- Subfamily: Amblyseiinae
- Genus: Pholaseius; Beard, 2001

Genus of mites

Pholaseius is a genus of mites in the Phytoseiidae family.

== Species ==
- Pholaseius colliculatus Beard, 2001
