= Noeledius =

Scientific classification
- Kingdom: Animalia
- Phylum: Arthropoda
- Subphylum: Chelicerata
- Class: Arachnida
- Order: Mesostigmata
- Family: Phytoseiidae
- Subfamily: Amblyseiinae
- Genus: Noeledius; Muma & Denmark, 1968

Genus of mites

Noeledius is a genus of mites in the Phytoseiidae family.

== Species ==
- Noeledius iphiformis (Muma, 1962)
