= Macmurtryseius =

Scientific classification
- Kingdom: Animalia
- Phylum: Arthropoda
- Subphylum: Chelicerata
- Class: Arachnida
- Order: Mesostigmata
- Family: Phytoseiidae
- Subfamily: Amblyseiinae
- Genus: Macmurtryseius; Kolodochka & Denmark, 1995

Genus of mites

Macmurtryseius is a genus of mites in the Phytoseiidae family.

== Species ==
The genus Macmurtryseius contains the following species:

- Macmurtryseius armellae (Schicha & Gutierrez, 1985)
- Macmurtryseius christinae (Schicha, 1981)
- Macmurtryseius hebridensis (McMurtry & Moraes, 1984)
