= Indoseiulus =

Scientific classification
- Kingdom: Animalia
- Phylum: Arthropoda
- Subphylum: Chelicerata
- Class: Arachnida
- Order: Mesostigmata
- Family: Phytoseiidae
- Subfamily: Amblyseiinae
- Genus: Indoseiulus; Ehara, 1982

Genus of mites

Indoseiulus is a genus of mites in the Phytoseiidae family.

== Species ==
- Indoseiulus duanensis Liang & Zeng, 1992
- Indoseiulus eharai Gupta, 1986
- Indoseiulus ghaiae Denmark & Kolodochka, 1993
- Indoseiulus irregularis (Evans, 1953)
- Indoseiulus liturivorus (Ehara, 1982)
- Indoseiulus ricini (Ghai & Menon, 1969)
- Indoseiulus semirregularis (Schicha & Corpuz-Raros, 1992)
