= Paraamblyseiulella =

Scientific classification
- Kingdom: Animalia
- Phylum: Arthropoda
- Subphylum: Chelicerata
- Class: Arachnida
- Order: Mesostigmata
- Family: Phytoseiidae
- Subfamily: Amblyseiinae
- Genus: Paraamblyseiulella; Chant & McMurtry, 2003

Genus of mites

Paraamblyseiulella is a genus of mites in the Phytoseiidae family.

== Species ==
- Paraamblyseiulella transmontanus (Ueckermann & Loots, 1987)
