= Macroseius =

Scientific classification
- Kingdom: Animalia
- Phylum: Arthropoda
- Subphylum: Chelicerata
- Class: Arachnida
- Order: Mesostigmata
- Family: Phytoseiidae
- Subfamily: Amblyseiinae
- Genus: Macroseius; Chant, Denmark & Baker, 1959

Genus of mites

Macroseius is a genus of mites in the Phytoseiidae family.

== Species ==
- Macroseius biscutatus Chant, Denmark & Baker, 1959
