= Paraamblyseius =

Scientific classification
- Kingdom: Animalia
- Phylum: Arthropoda
- Subphylum: Chelicerata
- Class: Arachnida
- Order: Mesostigmata
- Family: Phytoseiidae
- Subfamily: Amblyseiinae
- Genus: Paraamblyseius; Muma, 1962

Genus of mites

Paraamblyseius is a genus of mites in the Phytoseiidae family.

== Species ==
- Paraamblyseius crassipes Denmark, 1988
- Paraamblyseius dinghuensis (Wu & Qian, 1982)
- Paraamblyseius foliatus Corpuz-Raros, 1994
- Paraamblyseius formosanus (Ehara, 1970)
- Paraamblyseius fragariae Gupta, 1980
- Paraamblyseius gloreus (El-Banhawy, 1978)
- Paraamblyseius guangdongensis (Wu & Lan, 1991)
- Paraamblyseius lecanis (Schuster & Pritchard, 1963)
- Paraamblyseius lunatus Muma, 1962
- Paraamblyseius multicircularis Gondim Jr. & Moraes, 2001
- Paraamblyseius mumai (Prasad, 1968)
- Paraamblyseius mumai Gupta, 1980
- Paraamblyseius ogdeni De Leon, 1966
