= Neoparaphytoseius =

Scientific classification
- Domain: Eukaryota
- Kingdom: Animalia
- Phylum: Arthropoda
- Subphylum: Chelicerata
- Class: Arachnida
- Order: Mesostigmata
- Family: Phytoseiidae
- Genus: Neoparaphytoseius; Chant & McMurtry, 2003

Genus of mites

Neoparaphytoseius is a genus of mites in the Phytoseiidae family.

== Species ==
- Neoparaphytoseius sooretamus (El-Banhawy, 1984)
