= Knopkirie =

Scientific classification
- Kingdom: Animalia
- Phylum: Arthropoda
- Subphylum: Chelicerata
- Class: Arachnida
- Order: Mesostigmata
- Family: Phytoseiidae
- Subfamily: Amblyseiinae
- Genus: Knopkirie; Beard, 2001

Genus of mites

Knopkirie is a genus of mites in the Phytoseiidae family.

== Species ==
- Knopkirie banksiae (McMurtry & Schicha, 1987)
- Knopkirie patriciae Beard, 2001
- Knopkirie petri Beard, 2001
- Knopkirie volutus Beard, 2001
