= Neoparaphytoseius sooretamus =

Scientific classification
- Domain: Eukaryota
- Kingdom: Animalia
- Phylum: Arthropoda
- Subphylum: Chelicerata
- Class: Arachnida
- Order: Mesostigmata
- Family: Phytoseiidae
- Genus: Neoparaphytoseius
- Species: N. sooretamus

Binomial name
- Neoparaphytoseius sooretamus (El-Banhawy, 1984)

Species of mite

Neoparaphytoseius sooretamus is a species of mite in the family Phytoseiidae.
