= Fundiseius =

Scientific classification
- Kingdom: Animalia
- Phylum: Arthropoda
- Subphylum: Chelicerata
- Class: Arachnida
- Order: Mesostigmata
- Family: Phytoseiidae
- Subfamily: Amblyseiinae
- Genus: Fundiseius; Muma & Denmark, in Muma 1970

Genus of mites

Fundiseius is a genus of mites in the Phytoseiidae family.

== Species ==
- Fundiseius arenicolus (Muma, 1965)
- Fundiseius cavei Denmark & Evans, in Denmark, Evans, Aguilar, Vargas & Ochoa 1999
- Fundiseius cesi (Muma, 1965)
- Fundiseius coronatus (Fox, 1946)
- Fundiseius costaricus Denmark & Evans, in Denmark, Evans, Aguilar, Vargas & Ochoa 1999
- Fundiseius gonzalezi (Athias-Henriot, 1967)
- Fundiseius grandis (Berlese, 1914)
- Fundiseius hapoli (Gupta, 1986)
- Fundiseius imbricata (Muma & Denmark, 1969)
- Fundiseius morgani (Chant, 1957)
- Fundiseius sentralus Denmark & Evans, in Denmark, Evans, Aguilar, Vargas & Ochoa 1999
- Fundiseius timagami (Chant & Hansell, 1971)
- Fundiseius tucumanensis (Sheals, 1962)
- Fundiseius urquharti (Yoshida-Shaul & Chant, 1988)
