= Phytoseius =

Scientific classification
- Kingdom: Animalia
- Phylum: Arthropoda
- Subphylum: Chelicerata
- Class: Arachnida
- Order: Mesostigmata
- Family: Phytoseiidae
- Subfamily: Phytoseiinae
- Genus: Phytoseius; Ribaga, 1904

Genus of mites

Phytoseius is a genus of mites in the Phytoseiidae family.

== Species ==
- Phytoseius acaciae Walter & Beard, 1997
- Phytoseius aleuritius Wu, 1981
- Phytoseius amba Pritchard & Baker, 1962
- Phytoseius antigamenti El-Banhawy & Abou-Awad, 1989
- Phytoseius averrhoae De Leon, 1965
- Phytoseius balcanicus Wainstein, 1969
- Phytoseius bambusae Swirski & Shechter, 1961
- Phytoseius bandipurensis Gupta, 1980
- Phytoseius bennetti De Leon, 1965
- Phytoseius betsiboka Blommers, 1976
- Phytoseius betulae Denmark, 1966
- Phytoseius blakistoni Ehara, 1966
- Phytoseius borealis Chant, 1965
- Phytoseius brevicrinis Swirski & Shechter, 1961
- Phytoseius brigalow Walter & Beard, 1997
- Phytoseius bulgariensis Wainstein, 1969
- Phytoseius bunya Walter & Beard, 1997
- Phytoseius californicus Kennett, 1967
- Phytoseius camelot Walter & Beard, 1997
- Phytoseius campestris Ehara, 1967
- Phytoseius canadensis Chant, 1965
- Phytoseius capitatus Ehara, 1966
- Phytoseius carpineus Wainstein, 1978
- Phytoseius chanti Denmark, 1966
- Phytoseius chinensis Wu & Li, 1982
- Phytoseius ciliatus Wainstein, 1975
- Phytoseius cismontanus De Leon, 1965
- Phytoseius coheni Swirski & Shechter, 1961
- Phytoseius comodera El-Banhawy & Abou-Awad, 1989
- Phytoseius corniger Wainstein, 1959
- Phytoseius corylus Wu, Lan & Zhang, 1992
- Phytoseius cotini Wang & Xu, 1985
- Phytoseius crenatus Ryu, 1993
- Phytoseius crinitus Swirski & Shechter, 1961
- Phytoseius curoatus Chaudhri
- Phytoseius curtisetus Moraes & Mesa, in Moraes, Mesa & Braun 1991
- Phytoseius curvatus Chaudhri, 1973
- Phytoseius dandongensis Lu & Yin, 1992
- Phytoseius danutae Walter & Beard, 1997
- Phytoseius darwin Walter & Beard, 1997
- Phytoseius decoratus Gonzalez & Schuster, 1962
- Phytoseius deleoni Denmark, 1966
- Phytoseius delicatus Chant, 1965
- Phytoseius devildevil Walter & Beard, 1997
- Phytoseius diutius Corpuz-Raros, 1966
- Phytoseius domesticus Rather, 1985
- Phytoseius douglasensis Schicha, 1984
- Phytoseius duplus Ueckermann & Loots, 1985
- Phytoseius echinus Wainstein & Arutunjan, 1970
- Phytoseius ferax Afzal, Akbar & Qayyum, 2000
- Phytoseius ferox Pritchard & Baker, 1962
- Phytoseius flagrum Shahid, Siddiqui & Chaudhri, 1982
- Phytoseius fotheringhamiae Denmark & Schicha, 1975
- Phytoseius fujianensis Wu, 1981
- Phytoseius glareosus Corpuz-Raros, 1966
- Phytoseius guianensis De Leon, 1965
- Phytoseius hawaiiensis Prasad, 1968
- Phytoseius hera Wainstein & Beglyarov, 1972
- Phytoseius hongkongensis Swirski & Shechter, 1961
- Phytoseius hornus Shahid, Siddiqui & Chaudhri, 1982
- Phytoseius horridus Ribaga, 1904
- Phytoseius huaxiensis Xin, Liang & Ke, 1982
- Phytoseius huqiuensis Wu, 1980
- Phytoseius hydrophyllis Poe, 1970
- Phytoseius ikeharai Ehara, 1967
- Phytoseius improcerus Corpuz-Raros, 1966
- Phytoseius incisus Wu & Li, 1984
- Phytoseius indicus Bhattacharyya, 1968
- Phytoseius intermedius Evans & MacFarlane, 1962
- Phytoseius jujuba Gupta, 1977
- Phytoseius juvenis Wainstein & Arutunjan, 1970
- Phytoseius kapuri Gupta, 1969
- Phytoseius kazusanus Ehara, in Ehara, Okada & Kato 1994
- Phytoseius kisumuensis Moraes & McMurtry, in Moraes, McMurtry, van den Berg & Yaninek 1989
- Phytoseius kishii Ehara, 1967
- Phytoseius koreanus Ryu & Ehara, 1991
- Phytoseius latinus El-Banhawy, 1984
- Phytoseius leaki Schicha, 1977
- Phytoseius leonmexicanus (Hirschmann, 1962)
- Phytoseius litchfieldensis Walter & Beard, 1997
- Phytoseius livschitzi Wainstein & Beglyarov, 1972
- Phytoseius longchuanensis Wu, 1997
- Phytoseius longus Wu & Li, 1985
- Phytoseius lyma Shahid, Siddiqui & Chaudhri, 1982
- Phytoseius macropilis (Banks, 1909)
- Phytoseius macrosetosus Gupta, 1977
- Phytoseius maldahaensis Gupta, 1992
- Phytoseius maltshenkovae Wainstein, 1973
- Phytoseius mancus Afzal, Akbar & Qayyum, 2000
- Phytoseius mansehraensis Chaudhri, 1973
- Phytoseius mantecanus De Leon, 1965
- Phytoseius mantoni Walter & Beard, 1997
- Phytoseius marumbus El-Banhawy, 1984
- Phytoseius mayottae Schicha, 1984
- Phytoseius meyerae Gupta, 1977
- Phytoseius mindanensis Schicha & Corpuz-Raros, 1992
- Phytoseius minutus Narayanan, Kaur & Ghai, 1960
- Phytoseius mixtus Chaudhri, 1973
- Phytoseius moderatus Wainstein & Beglyarov, 1972
- Phytoseius montanus De Leon, 1965
- Phytoseius mumafloridanus (Hirschmann, 1962)
- Phytoseius mumai Ehara, 1966
- Phytoseius nahuatlensis De Leon, 1959
- Phytoseius namdaphaensis Gupta, 1986
- Phytoseius neoamba Ueckermann & Loots, 1985
- Phytoseius neocorniger Gupta, 1977
- Phytoseius neoferox Ehara & Bhandhufalck, 1977
- Phytoseius neohongkongensis Moraes & McMurtry, in Moraes, McMurtry, van den Berg & Yaninek 1989
- Phytoseius neomontanus Moraes & McMurtry, in Moraes, McMurtry, van den Berg & Yaninek 1989
- Phytoseius nipponicus Ehara, 1962
- Phytoseius nudus Wu & Li, 1984
- Phytoseius olbios Afzal, Akbar & Qayyum, 2000
- Phytoseius onilahy Blommers, 1976
- Phytoseius oreillyi Walter & Beard, 1997
- Phytoseius orizaba De Leon, 1965
- Phytoseius paludis De Leon, 1965
- Phytoseius paluma Walter & Beard, 1997
- Phytoseius panormita Ragusa & Swirski, 1982
- Phytoseius perforatus El-Badry, 1968
- Phytoseius pernambucanus Moraes & McMurtry, 1983
- Phytoseius pesidiumii Nassar & Kandeel, 1983
- Phytoseius petentis Chaudhri, Akbar & Rasool, 1979
- Phytoseius phenax Afzal, Akbar & Qayyum, 2000
- Phytoseius plumifer (Canestrini & Fanzago, 1876)
- Phytoseius punjabensis Gupta, 1977
- Phytoseius purseglovei De Leon, 1965
- Phytoseius qianshanensis Liang & Ke, 1981
- Phytoseius quercicola Ehara, in Ehara, Okada & Kato 1994
- Phytoseius rachelae Swirski & Shechter, 1961
- Phytoseius rasilis Corpuz-Raros, 1966
- Phytoseius rex De Leon, 1966
- Phytoseius rhabdifer De Leon, 1965
- Phytoseius ribagai Athias-Henriot, in Chant & Athias-Henriot 1960
- Phytoseius rimandoi Corpuz-Raros, 1966
- Phytoseius roseus Gupta, 1969
- Phytoseius rubiginosae Schicha, 1984
- Phytoseius rubii Xin, Liang & Ke, 1982
- Phytoseius rubiphilus Wainstein & Vartapetov, 1972
- Phytoseius rugatus Tseng, 1976
- Phytoseius rugosus Denmark, 1966
- Phytoseius ruidus Wu & Li, 1984
- Phytoseius salicis Wainstein & Arutunjan, 1970
- Phytoseius scabiosus Xin, Liang & Ke, 1983
- Phytoseius scrobis Denmark, 1966
- Phytoseius seungtaii Ryu & Ehara, 1993
- Phytoseius severus Wainstein & Vartapetov, 1972
- Phytoseius shuteri Schicha, 1987
- Phytoseius solanus El-Badry, 1968
- Phytoseius songshanensis Wang & Xu, 1985
- Phytoseius sonunensis Ryu & Ehara, 1993
- Phytoseius spathulatus Chaudhri, 1973
- Phytoseius spoofi (Oudemans, 1915)
- Phytoseius stammeri (Hirschmann, 1962)
- Phytoseius stephaniae Schicha, 1984
- Phytoseius subtilis Wu & Li, 1984
- Phytoseius swirskii Gupta, 1980
- Phytoseius taiyushani Swirski & Shechter, 1961
- Phytoseius tenuiformis Ehara, 1978
- Phytoseius tropicalis Daneshvar, 1987
- Phytoseius turiacus Wainstein & Kolodochka, 1976
- Phytoseius vaginatus Wu, 1983
- Phytoseius venator Khan, Chaudhri & Khan, 1990
- Phytoseius viaticus De Leon, 1967
- Phytoseius wainsteini Gupta, 1981
- Phytoseius wangii Wu & Ou, 1998
- Phytoseius woodburyi De Leon, 1965
- Phytoseius woolwichensis Schicha, 1977
- Phytoseius yuhangensis Yin, Yu, Shi & Yang, 1996
- Phytoseius yunnanensis Lou, Yin & Tong, 1992
