= Archeosetus =

Scientific classification
- Kingdom: Animalia
- Phylum: Arthropoda
- Subphylum: Chelicerata
- Class: Arachnida
- Order: Mesostigmata
- Family: Phytoseiidae
- Subfamily: Amblyseiinae
- Genus: Archeosetus; Chant & McMurtry, 2002

Genus of mites

Archeosetus is a genus of mites in the Phytoseiidae family.

== Species ==
- Archeosetus rackae (Fain, 1987)
