= Amblyseiinae =

Scientific classification
- Kingdom: Animalia
- Phylum: Arthropoda
- Subphylum: Chelicerata
- Class: Arachnida
- Order: Mesostigmata
- Family: Phytoseiidae
- Subfamily: Amblyseiinae; Muma, 1961

Subfamily of mites

The Amblyseiinae are a subfamily of predatory mites in the Phytoseiidae family.

== Genera ==
These genera are part of this subfamily:

- Amblyseiella Muma, 1955
- Amblyseiulella Muma, 1961
- Amblyseius Berlese, 1914
- Archeosetus Chant & McMurtry, 2002
- Asperoseius Chant, 1957
- Chelaseius Muma & Denmark, 1968
- Chileseius Gonzalez & Schuster, 1962
- Eharius Tuttle & Muma, 1973
- Euseius De Leon, 1967
- Evansoseius Sheals, 1962
- Fundiseius Muma & Denmark, in Muma 1970
- Honduriella Denmark & Evans, 1999
- Indoseiulus Ehara, 1982
- Iphiseiodes De Leon, 1966
- Iphiseius Berlese, 1921
- Kampimodromus Nesbitt, 1951
- Kampimoseiulella Chant & McMurtry, 2003
- Knopkirie Beard, 2001
- Macmurtryseius Kolodochka & Denmark, 1995
- Macroseius Chant, Denmark & Baker, 1959
- Neoparaphytoseius Chant & McMurtry, 2003
- Neoseiulus Hughes, 1948
- Noeledius Muma & Denmark, 1968
- Okiseius Ehara, 1967
- Olpiseius Beard, 2001
- Paraamblyseiulella Chant & McMurtry, 2003
- Paraamblyseius Muma, 1962
- Paragigagnathus Amitai & Grinberg, 1971
- Parakampimodromus Chant & McMurtry, 2003
- Pholaseius Beard, 2001
- Phyllodromus De Leon, 1959
- Phytoscutus Muma, 1961
- Phytoseiulus Evans, 1952
- Proprioseiopsis Muma, 1961
- Proprioseiulus Muma, 1968
- Proprioseius Chant, 1957
- Quadromalus Moraes, Denmark & Guerrero, 1982
- Ricoseius De Leon, 1965
- Swirskiseius Denmark & Evans, in Denmark, Evans, Aguilar, Vargas & Ochoa 1999
- Typhlodromips De Leon, 1965
- Typhloseiella Muma, 1961
