= Chergui (disambiguation) =

Chergui is an island to the east of mainland Tunisia and part of the Kerkennah islands.

Chergui, from the Arabic šarqīa (شرقية) meaning "eastern," and may refer to:

- Chergui (wind), a hot, dry wind in Morocco coming from the Sahara
- Eharius chergui, a species of mite

== Surname ==
- Brahim Chergui (1922–2016), or H'mida, an Algerian revolutionary
- Idriss Ech-Chergui (born 1985), a French professional footballer
- Kamel Chergui (born 1993), a French professional footballer
- Majed Chergui (born 1956), a Swiss and French physicist
- Malek Chergui (born 1988), a French professional footballer
- Samir Chergui (born 1999), a professional footballer
- Smaïl Chergui (born 1956), an Algerian diplomat
