= H. maxima =

H. maxima may refer to:

- Heteropoda maxima, a spider endemic to Laos
- Heterothele maxima, a spider endemic to Tanzania
- Heuchera maxima, a plant endemic to the Channel Islands of California
- Honduriella maxima, a mite with a single pair of spiracles positioned laterally on the body
- Hydrostachys maxima, an African plant
- Hyla maxima, a New World frog
