= T. proximus =

T. proximus may refer to:

- Tachinus proximus, a beetle species in the genus Tachinus
- Thamnophis proximus, a snake species
- Thymus proximus, a plant species in the genus Thymus
- Typhlodromips proximus, a mite species in the genus Typhlodromips
- Tyrannochthonius proximus, a pseudoscorpion species in the genus Tyrannochthonius

== See also ==
- Proximus (disambiguation)
