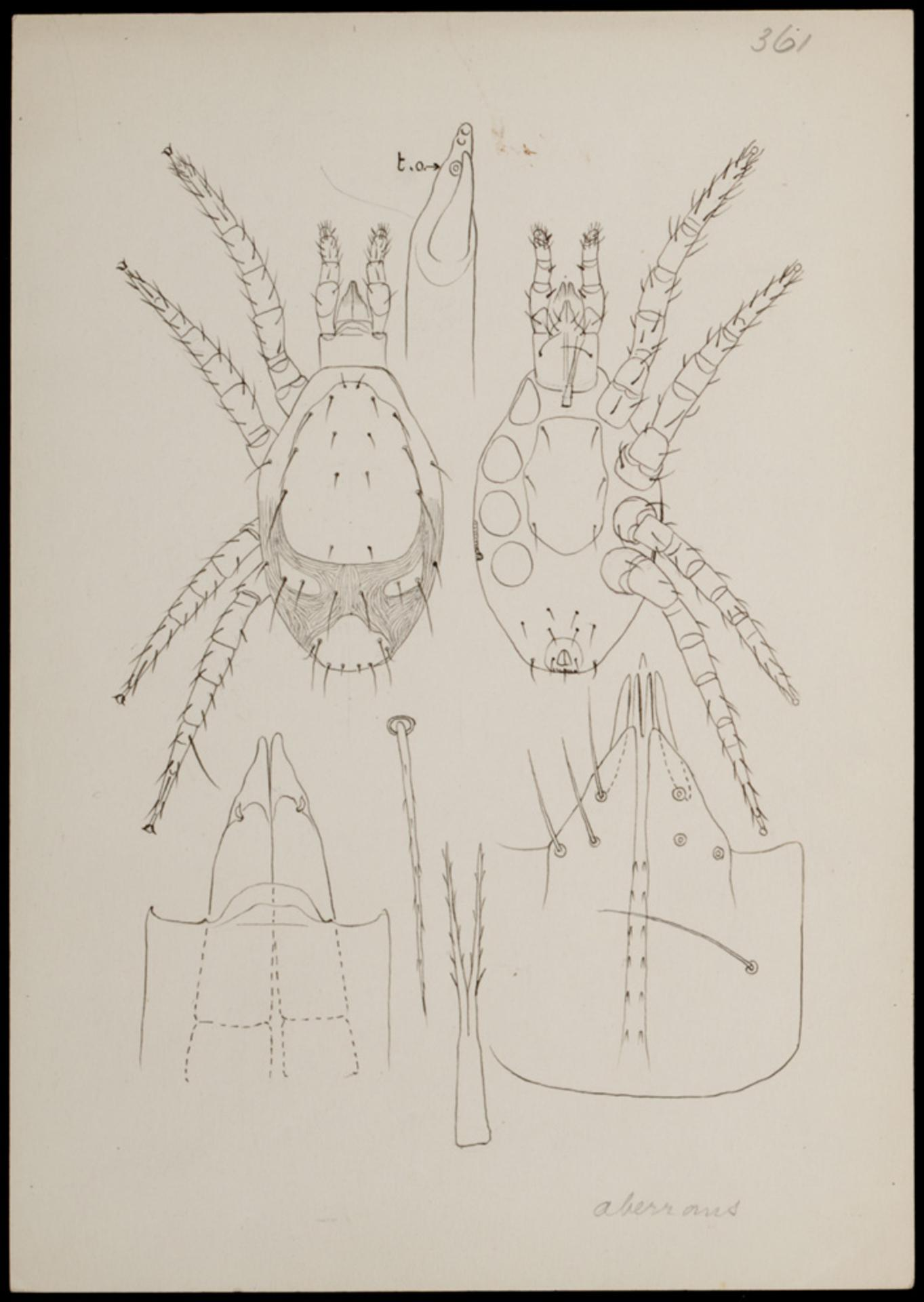
- as Typhlodromus aberrans

Scientific classification
- Kingdom: Animalia
- Phylum: Arthropoda
- Subphylum: Chelicerata
- Class: Arachnida
- Order: Mesostigmata
- Family: Phytoseiidae
- Genus: Kampimodromus
- Species: K. aberrans

Binomial name
- Kampimodromus aberrans (Oudemans, 1930)

Synonyms
- Typhlodromus aberrans Oudemans, 1930; Typhlodromus vitis Oudemans, 1930

= Kampimodromus aberrans =

Species of mite

Kampimodromus aberrans is a species of mite in the family Phytoseiidae. It is found in Europe.
