= Kampimodromus coryli =

Scientific classification
- Domain: Eukaryota
- Kingdom: Animalia
- Phylum: Arthropoda
- Subphylum: Chelicerata
- Class: Arachnida
- Order: Mesostigmata
- Family: Phytoseiidae
- Genus: Kampimodromus
- Species: K. coryli

Binomial name
- Kampimodromus coryli Meshkov, 1999

Species of mite

Kampimodromus coryli is a species of mite in the family Phytoseiidae.
