= Proprioseiopsis gallus =

Scientific classification
- Kingdom: Animalia
- Phylum: Arthropoda
- Subphylum: Chelicerata
- Class: Arachnida
- Order: Mesostigmata
- Family: Phytoseiidae
- Genus: Proprioseiopsis
- Species: P. gallus

Binomial name
- Proprioseiopsis gallus Karg, 1989

Species of mite

Proprioseiopsis gallus is a species of mite in the family Phytoseiidae.
