= Okiseius tribulation =

Scientific classification
- Domain: Eukaryota
- Kingdom: Animalia
- Phylum: Arthropoda
- Subphylum: Chelicerata
- Class: Arachnida
- Order: Mesostigmata
- Family: Phytoseiidae
- Genus: Okiseius
- Species: O. tribulation

Binomial name
- Okiseius tribulation Walter, 1999

Species of mite

Okiseius tribulation is a species of mite in the family Phytoseiidae.
