= Proprioseiopsis gelikmani =

Scientific classification
- Domain: Eukaryota
- Kingdom: Animalia
- Phylum: Arthropoda
- Subphylum: Chelicerata
- Class: Arachnida
- Order: Mesostigmata
- Family: Phytoseiidae
- Genus: Proprioseiopsis
- Species: P. gelikmani

Binomial name
- Proprioseiopsis gelikmani (Wainstein & Arutunjan, 1970)

Species of mite

Proprioseiopsis gelikmani is a species of mite in the family Phytoseiidae.
