= Proprioseiulus =

Scientific classification
- Kingdom: Animalia
- Phylum: Arthropoda
- Subphylum: Chelicerata
- Class: Arachnida
- Order: Mesostigmata
- Family: Phytoseiidae
- Subfamily: Amblyseiinae
- Genus: Proprioseiulus; Muma & Denmark, 1968

Genus of mites

Proprioseiulus is a genus of mites in the Phytoseiidae family.

== Species ==
- Proprioseiulus darwinensis (Schicha, 1987)
- Proprioseiulus paxi (Muma, 1965)
- Proprioseiulus sandersi (Chant, 1959)
