= Okiseius tibetagramins =

Scientific classification
- Kingdom: Animalia
- Phylum: Arthropoda
- Subphylum: Chelicerata
- Class: Arachnida
- Order: Mesostigmata
- Family: Phytoseiidae
- Genus: Okiseius
- Species: O. tibetagramins

Binomial name
- Okiseius tibetagramins (Wu, 1987)

Species of mite

Okiseius is a species of mite belonging to the genus Okiseius in the family Phytoseiidae.
