= Okiseius yazuliensis =

Scientific classification
- Domain: Eukaryota
- Kingdom: Animalia
- Phylum: Arthropoda
- Subphylum: Chelicerata
- Class: Arachnida
- Order: Mesostigmata
- Family: Phytoseiidae
- Genus: Okiseius
- Species: O. yazuliensis

Binomial name
- Okiseius yazuliensis Gupta, 1986

Species of mite

Okiseius yazuliensis is a species of mite in the family Phytoseiidae.
