= Olpiseius perthae =

Scientific classification
- Domain: Eukaryota
- Kingdom: Animalia
- Phylum: Arthropoda
- Subphylum: Chelicerata
- Class: Arachnida
- Order: Mesostigmata
- Family: Phytoseiidae
- Genus: Olpiseius
- Species: O. perthae

Binomial name
- Olpiseius perthae (McMurtry & Schicha, 1987)

Species of mite

Olpiseius perthae is a species of mite in the family Phytoseiidae.
