= Okiseius morenoi =

Scientific classification
- Domain: Eukaryota
- Kingdom: Animalia
- Phylum: Arthropoda
- Subphylum: Chelicerata
- Class: Arachnida
- Order: Mesostigmata
- Family: Phytoseiidae
- Genus: Okiseius
- Species: O. morenoi

Binomial name
- Okiseius morenoi Schicha, 1987

Species of mite

Okiseius morenoi is a species of mite in the family Phytoseiidae.
