= Chelaseius brazilensis =

Scientific classification
- Kingdom: Animalia
- Phylum: Arthropoda
- Subphylum: Chelicerata
- Class: Arachnida
- Order: Mesostigmata
- Family: Phytoseiidae
- Genus: Chelaseius
- Species: C. brazilensis

Binomial name
- Chelaseius brazilensis Denmark & Kolodochka, 1990

Species of mite

Chelaseius brazilensis is a species of mite in the family Phytoseiidae.
