= Eharius kuznetzovi =

Scientific classification
- Kingdom: Animalia
- Phylum: Arthropoda
- Subphylum: Chelicerata
- Class: Arachnida
- Order: Mesostigmata
- Family: Phytoseiidae
- Genus: Eharius
- Species: E. kuznetzovi

Binomial name
- Eharius kuznetzovi (Kolodochka, 1979)

Species of mite

Eharius kuznetzovi is a species of mite in the family Phytoseiidae.

== Distribution ==
E. kuznetzovi is native to Crimea; where all known specimens have been found.
