= Amblyseiulella omei =

Scientific classification
- Domain: Eukaryota
- Kingdom: Animalia
- Phylum: Arthropoda
- Subphylum: Chelicerata
- Class: Arachnida
- Order: Mesostigmata
- Family: Phytoseiidae
- Genus: Amblyseiulella
- Species: A. omei

Binomial name
- Amblyseiulella omei (Wu & Li, 1984)

Species of mite

Amblyseiulella omei is a species of mite in the family Phytoseiidae.
