= Proprioseiopsis globosus =

Scientific classification
- Domain: Eukaryota
- Kingdom: Animalia
- Phylum: Arthropoda
- Subphylum: Chelicerata
- Class: Arachnida
- Order: Mesostigmata
- Family: Phytoseiidae
- Genus: Proprioseiopsis
- Species: P. globosus

Binomial name
- Proprioseiopsis globosus (Gonzalez & Schuster, 1962)

Species of mite

Proprioseiopsis globosus is a species of mite in the family Phytoseiidae.
