= Proprioseiopsis clausae =

Scientific classification
- Domain: Eukaryota
- Kingdom: Animalia
- Phylum: Arthropoda
- Subphylum: Chelicerata
- Class: Arachnida
- Order: Mesostigmata
- Family: Phytoseiidae
- Genus: Proprioseiopsis
- Species: P. clausae

Binomial name
- Proprioseiopsis clausae (Muma, 1962)

Species of mite

Proprioseiopsis clausae is a species of mite in the family Phytoseiidae.
