= Kampimodromus echii =

Scientific classification
- Domain: Eukaryota
- Kingdom: Animalia
- Phylum: Arthropoda
- Subphylum: Chelicerata
- Class: Arachnida
- Order: Mesostigmata
- Family: Phytoseiidae
- Genus: Kampimodromus
- Species: K. echii

Binomial name
- Kampimodromus echii Ferragut & Pena-Estevez, 2003

Species of mite

Kampimodromus echii is a species of mite in the family Phytoseiidae.
