= Kampimodromus langei =

Scientific classification
- Domain: Eukaryota
- Kingdom: Animalia
- Phylum: Arthropoda
- Subphylum: Chelicerata
- Class: Arachnida
- Order: Mesostigmata
- Family: Phytoseiidae
- Genus: Kampimodromus
- Species: K. langei

Binomial name
- Kampimodromus langei Wainstein & Arutunjan, 1973

Species of mite

Kampimodromus langei is a species of mite in the family Phytoseiidae. It is found in Europe.
