= Ricoseius =

Scientific classification
- Kingdom: Animalia
- Phylum: Arthropoda
- Subphylum: Chelicerata
- Class: Arachnida
- Order: Mesostigmata
- Family: Phytoseiidae
- Subfamily: Amblyseiinae
- Genus: Ricoseius; De Leon, 1965

Genus of mites

Ricoseius is a genus of mites in the Phytoseiidae family.

== Species ==
- Ricoseius loxocheles (De Leon, 1965)
