= Iphiseiodes kamahorae =

Scientific classification
- Domain: Eukaryota
- Kingdom: Animalia
- Phylum: Arthropoda
- Subphylum: Chelicerata
- Class: Arachnida
- Order: Mesostigmata
- Family: Phytoseiidae
- Genus: Iphiseiodes
- Species: I. kamahorae

Binomial name
- Iphiseiodes kamahorae De Leon, 1966

Species of mite

Iphiseiodes kamahorae is a species of mite in the family Phytoseiidae.
