= Chileseius camposi =

Scientific classification
- Domain: Eukaryota
- Kingdom: Animalia
- Phylum: Arthropoda
- Subphylum: Chelicerata
- Class: Arachnida
- Order: Mesostigmata
- Family: Phytoseiidae
- Genus: Chileseius
- Species: C. camposi

Binomial name
- Chileseius camposi Gonzalez & Schuster, 1962

Species of mite

Chileseius camposi is a species of mite in the family Phytoseiidae.
