= Typhloseiella =

Scientific classification
- Kingdom: Animalia
- Phylum: Arthropoda
- Subphylum: Chelicerata
- Class: Arachnida
- Order: Mesostigmata
- Family: Phytoseiidae
- Subfamily: Amblyseiinae
- Genus: Typhloseiella; Muma, 1961

Genus of mites

Typhloseiella is a genus of mites in the Phytoseiidae family.

== Species ==
- Typhloseiella isotricha (Athias-Henriot, 1958)
- Typhloseiella perforatus (Wainstein, 1980)
