= Eharius =

Scientific classification
- Kingdom: Animalia
- Phylum: Arthropoda
- Subphylum: Chelicerata
- Class: Arachnida
- Order: Mesostigmata
- Family: Phytoseiidae
- Subfamily: Amblyseiinae
- Genus: Eharius; Tuttle & Muma, 1973

Genus of mites

Eharius is a genus of mites in the Phytoseiidae family.

== Species ==
The genus Eharius contains the following species:

- Eharius chergui (Athias-Henriot, 1960)
- Eharius hermonensis Amitai & Swirski, 1980
- Eharius hymetticus (Papadoulis & Emmanouel, 1991)
- Eharius kostini (Kolodochka, 1979)
- Eharius kuznetzovi (Kolodochka, 1979)
- Eharius marzhaniani (Arutunjan, 1969)
