= Proprioseiopsis bregetovae =

Scientific classification
- Kingdom: Animalia
- Phylum: Arthropoda
- Subphylum: Chelicerata
- Class: Arachnida
- Order: Mesostigmata
- Family: Phytoseiidae
- Genus: Proprioseiopsis
- Species: P. bregetovae

Binomial name
- Proprioseiopsis bregetovae (Abbasova, 1970)

Species of mite

Proprioseiopsis bregetovae is a species of mite in the family Phytoseiidae.
