= Amblyseiulella nucifera =

Scientific classification
- Domain: Eukaryota
- Kingdom: Animalia
- Phylum: Arthropoda
- Subphylum: Chelicerata
- Class: Arachnida
- Order: Mesostigmata
- Family: Phytoseiidae
- Genus: Amblyseiulella
- Species: A. nucifera

Binomial name
- Amblyseiulella nucifera (Gupta, 1979)

Species of mite

Amblyseiulella nucifera is a species of mite in the family Phytoseiidae.
