= Proprioseiopsis cannaensis =

Scientific classification
- Kingdom: Animalia
- Phylum: Arthropoda
- Subphylum: Chelicerata
- Class: Arachnida
- Order: Mesostigmata
- Family: Phytoseiidae
- Genus: Proprioseiopsis
- Species: P. cannaensis

Binomial name
- Proprioseiopsis cannaensis (Muma, 1962)

Species of mite

Proprioseiopsis cannaensis is a species of mite in the family Phytoseiidae.
