= Amblyseiulella prunii =

Scientific classification
- Domain: Eukaryota
- Kingdom: Animalia
- Phylum: Arthropoda
- Subphylum: Chelicerata
- Class: Arachnida
- Order: Mesostigmata
- Family: Phytoseiidae
- Genus: Amblyseiulella
- Species: A. prunii

Binomial name
- Amblyseiulella prunii (K.e.Liang, 1982)

Species of mite

Amblyseiulella prunii is a species of mite in the family Phytoseiidae.
