= Proprioseiopsis campanulus =

Scientific classification
- Domain: Eukaryota
- Kingdom: Animalia
- Phylum: Arthropoda
- Subphylum: Chelicerata
- Class: Arachnida
- Order: Mesostigmata
- Family: Phytoseiidae
- Genus: Proprioseiopsis
- Species: P. campanulus

Binomial name
- Proprioseiopsis campanulus Karg, 1979

Species of mite

Proprioseiopsis campanulus is a species of mite in the family Phytoseiidae.
