= Okiseius subtropicus =

Scientific classification
- Domain: Eukaryota
- Kingdom: Animalia
- Phylum: Arthropoda
- Subphylum: Chelicerata
- Class: Arachnida
- Order: Mesostigmata
- Family: Phytoseiidae
- Genus: Okiseius
- Species: O. subtropicus

Binomial name
- Okiseius subtropicus Ehara, 1967

Species of mite

Okiseius subtropicus is a species of mite in the family Phytoseiidae.
