= Proprioseiopsis eurynotus =

Scientific classification
- Domain: Eukaryota
- Kingdom: Animalia
- Phylum: Arthropoda
- Subphylum: Chelicerata
- Class: Arachnida
- Order: Mesostigmata
- Family: Phytoseiidae
- Genus: Proprioseiopsis
- Species: P. eurynotus

Binomial name
- Proprioseiopsis eurynotus (van der Merwe, 1968)

Species of mite

Proprioseiopsis eurynotus is a species of mite in the family Phytoseiidae.
