= Kampimodromus ragusai =

Scientific classification
- Domain: Eukaryota
- Kingdom: Animalia
- Phylum: Arthropoda
- Subphylum: Chelicerata
- Class: Arachnida
- Order: Mesostigmata
- Family: Phytoseiidae
- Genus: Kampimodromus
- Species: K. ragusai

Binomial name
- Kampimodromus ragusai Swirski & Amitai, 1997

Species of mite

Kampimodromus ragusai is a species of mite in the family Phytoseiidae.
