= Proprioseiopsis amplus =

Scientific classification
- Domain: Eukaryota
- Kingdom: Animalia
- Phylum: Arthropoda
- Subphylum: Chelicerata
- Class: Arachnida
- Order: Mesostigmata
- Family: Phytoseiidae
- Genus: Proprioseiopsis
- Species: P. amplus

Binomial name
- Proprioseiopsis amplus (Wainstein, 1983)

Species of mite

Proprioseiopsis amplus is a species of mite in the family Phytoseiidae.
