= Okiseius eharai =

Scientific classification
- Domain: Eukaryota
- Kingdom: Animalia
- Phylum: Arthropoda
- Subphylum: Chelicerata
- Class: Arachnida
- Order: Mesostigmata
- Family: Phytoseiidae
- Genus: Okiseius
- Species: O. eharai

Binomial name
- Okiseius eharai K.e.Liang, 1982

Species of mite in the family Phytoseiidae

Okiseius eharai is a species of mite in the family Phytoseiidae. It was discovered in 1982 by scientist K.e. Liang. Very less is known about this species on the web so far.
