= Amblyseiulella amanoi =

Scientific classification
- Domain: Eukaryota
- Kingdom: Animalia
- Phylum: Arthropoda
- Subphylum: Chelicerata
- Class: Arachnida
- Order: Mesostigmata
- Family: Phytoseiidae
- Genus: Amblyseiulella
- Species: A. amanoi

Binomial name
- Amblyseiulella amanoi Ehara, 1994

Species of mite

Amblyseiulella amanoi is a species of mite in the family Phytoseiidae.
