= Iphiseiodes metapodalis =

Scientific classification
- Domain: Eukaryota
- Kingdom: Animalia
- Phylum: Arthropoda
- Subphylum: Chelicerata
- Class: Arachnida
- Order: Mesostigmata
- Family: Phytoseiidae
- Genus: Iphiseiodes
- Species: I. metapodalis

Binomial name
- Iphiseiodes metapodalis (El-Banhawy, 1984)

Species of mite

Iphiseiodes metapodalis is a species of mite in the family Phytoseiidae.
