= Amblyseiulella chombongenis =

Scientific classification
- Domain: Eukaryota
- Kingdom: Animalia
- Phylum: Arthropoda
- Subphylum: Chelicerata
- Class: Arachnida
- Order: Mesostigmata
- Family: Phytoseiidae
- Genus: Amblyseiulella
- Species: A. chombongenis

Binomial name
- Amblyseiulella chombongenis Ryu & Lee, 1995

Species of mite

Amblyseiulella chombongenis is a species of mite in the family Phytoseiidae.
