= Eharius marzhaniani =

Scientific classification
- Kingdom: Animalia
- Phylum: Arthropoda
- Subphylum: Chelicerata
- Class: Arachnida
- Order: Mesostigmata
- Family: Phytoseiidae
- Genus: Eharius
- Species: E. marzhaniani

Binomial name
- Eharius marzhaniani (Arutunjan, 1969)

Species of mite

Eharius marzhaniani is a species of mite in the family Phytoseiidae.
