= Eharius hermonensis =

Scientific classification
- Kingdom: Animalia
- Phylum: Arthropoda
- Subphylum: Chelicerata
- Class: Arachnida
- Order: Mesostigmata
- Family: Phytoseiidae
- Genus: Eharius
- Species: E. hermonensis

Binomial name
- Eharius hermonensis Amitai & Swirski, 1980

Species of mite

Eharius hermonensis is a species of mite in the family Phytoseiidae.
