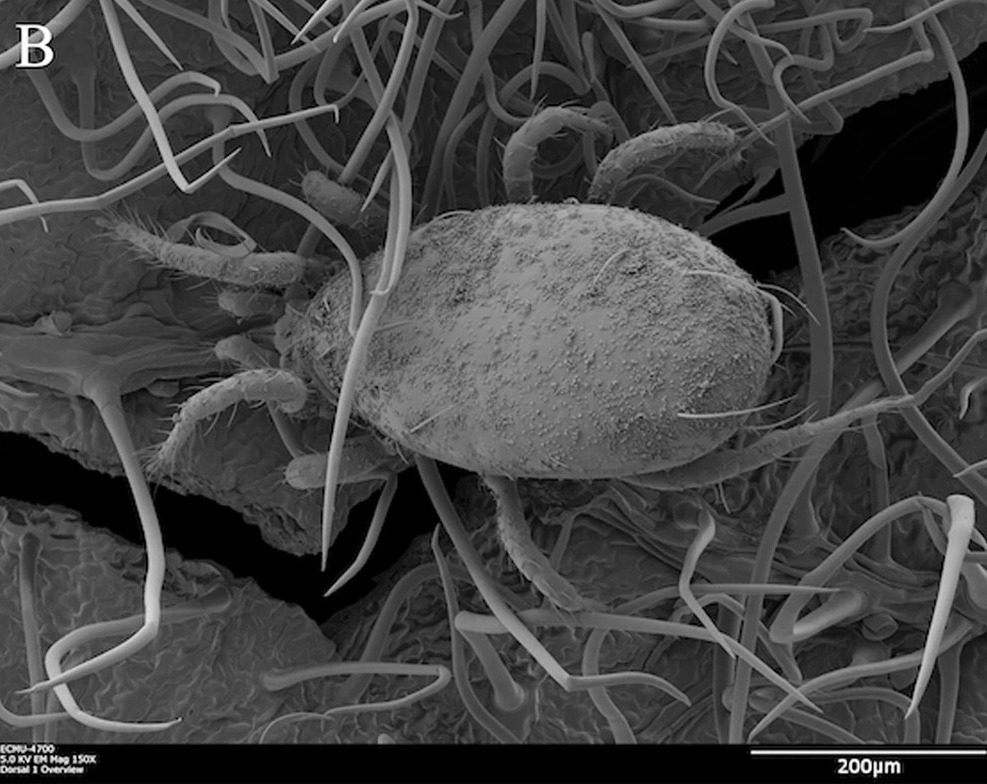
- Amblyseius swirskii. The rough texture is Beauveria bassiana conidia, a type of fungus).

Scientific classification
- Kingdom: Animalia
- Phylum: Arthropoda
- Subphylum: Chelicerata
- Class: Arachnida
- Order: Mesostigmata
- Family: Phytoseiidae
- Genus: Typhlodromips
- Species: T. swirskii

Binomial name
- Typhlodromips swirskii (Athias-Henriot, 1962)

Synonyms
- Amblyseius rykei; Amblyseius swirskii; Neoseiulus swirskii; Typhlodromips swirskii

= Typhlodromips swirskii =

Species of mite

Typhlodromips swirskii, the Swirski mite (synonymy: Amblyseius swirskii, Amblyseius rykei, Neoseiulus swirskii), is a species of predatory mite in the family Phytoseiidae. It is used in biological pest control of western flower thrips (Frankliniella occidentalis) in greenhouse- or indoor-grown crops. It was named for the Israeli entomologist Eliahu Swirski (1921-2002).

== Description ==
The adult T. swirskii has a pear-shaped body and is about 0.5 mm (0.02 in) in length. It has four pairs of legs, the front pair of which points forward, and a small number of paired bristles on the unsegmented body. The colour varies with the diet, being pale yellow or tan when thrips and whitefly are eaten, and reddish on some other diets. It is difficult to distinguish one species of predatory mite from another in the field.

== Distribution and habitat ==
T. swirskii is native to the eastern Mediterranean region where its range includes Italy, Cyprus, Greece, Turkey, Israel and Egypt. It is used as an agent of biological control on crops such as apple, apricot, citrus, cotton and vegetables. It has been introduced to other parts of the world, where the climate is suitable, including much of Europe, northern Africa, North America, Argentina, China and Japan.

== Biology ==
The life cycle consists of the egg stage, one larval stage, two nymphal stages and an adult stage. The eggs are laid on the undersides of leaves, usually on hairs near the junction of veins. They are oval, whitish and about 0.15 mm (0.006 in) long. They hatch into whitish, non-feeding, semi-transparent larvae with three pairs of legs. These soon develop into the four-legged nymphal stages, and then become adults, both nymphs and adults being predatory. The life cycle takes about five days at 25 °C (77 °F), and the mites can tolerate temperatures between 18 and 36 °C (64 and 97 °F), with 60 percent humidity.

== Host range ==
The host range includes the immature stages of western flower thrips, common blossom thrips, onion thrips, melon thrips and chilli thrips, as well as those of silverleaf whitefly and greenhouse whitefly. It can also consume Asian citrus psyllid, broad mites, and other herbivorous mites. When these prey species are not available, it is able to survive and reproduce on a diet of pollen and plant exudates, although its fecundity and growth rates are reduced under these circumstances. Where two prey species are available, it will prey on the most available one. For example, in a 2016 research project on field grown cucumber plants, it was successful in controlling melon thrips on the leaves, but not common blossom thrips on the flowers of the same plants.

== Use in biocontrol ==
Typhlodromips swirskii is used commercially in Europe and North America for biocontrol of whitefly and thrips in vegetables and ornamentals grown under cover. The cultured mites can be mixed with bran and sprinkled on the crop or spread by air blast. When multiple species of pest are present, it may effectively control one but not another; for example, in field grown cucumbers, it was found to control melon thrips on leaves, but failed to control common blossom thrips on flowers.
