= Chileseius paracamposi =

Scientific classification
- Domain: Eukaryota
- Kingdom: Animalia
- Phylum: Arthropoda
- Subphylum: Chelicerata
- Class: Arachnida
- Order: Mesostigmata
- Family: Phytoseiidae
- Genus: Chileseius
- Species: C. paracamposi

Binomial name
- Chileseius paracamposi Yoshida-Shaul & Chant, 1991

Species of mite

Chileseius paracamposi is a species of mite in the family Phytoseiidae.
