= Kampimodromus ericinus =

Scientific classification
- Kingdom: Animalia
- Phylum: Arthropoda
- Subphylum: Chelicerata
- Class: Arachnida
- Order: Mesostigmata
- Family: Phytoseiidae
- Genus: Kampimodromus
- Species: K. ericinus

Binomial name
- Kampimodromus ericinus Ragusa di Chiara & Tsolakis, 1994

Species of mite

Kampimodromus ericinus is a species of mite in the family Phytoseiidae.
