= Phyllodromus leiodis =

Scientific classification
- Domain: Eukaryota
- Kingdom: Animalia
- Phylum: Arthropoda
- Subphylum: Chelicerata
- Class: Arachnida
- Order: Mesostigmata
- Family: Phytoseiidae
- Genus: Phyllodromus
- Species: P. leiodis

Binomial name
- Phyllodromus leiodis De Leon, 1959

Species of arachnid

Phyllodromus leiodis is a species of mite in the family Phytoseiidae. It was originally discovered by Donald De Leon in Florida.
