= Proprioseiopsis farallonicus =

Scientific classification
- Domain: Eukaryota
- Kingdom: Animalia
- Phylum: Arthropoda
- Subphylum: Chelicerata
- Class: Arachnida
- Order: Mesostigmata
- Family: Phytoseiidae
- Genus: Proprioseiopsis
- Species: P. farallonicus

Binomial name
- Proprioseiopsis farallonicus (Moraes & Mesa, 1991)

Species of mite

Proprioseiopsis farallonicus is a species of mite in the family Phytoseiidae.
