= Proprioseius =

Scientific classification
- Kingdom: Animalia
- Phylum: Arthropoda
- Subphylum: Chelicerata
- Class: Arachnida
- Order: Mesostigmata
- Family: Phytoseiidae
- Subfamily: Amblyseiinae
- Genus: Proprioseius; Chant, 1957

Genus of mites

Proprioseius is a genus of mites in the Phytoseiidae family.

== Species ==
- Proprioseius aculeatus Moraes & Denmark, 1999
- Proprioseius anthurus Denmark & Muma, 1966
- Proprioseius clancyi Chant, 1957
- Proprioseius gibbus Moraes & Denmark, 1999
- Proprioseius kumaonensis Gupta, 1982
- Proprioseius meridionalis Chant, 1957
- Proprioseius mirandai De Leon, 1959
- Proprioseius oudemansi (Chant, 1959)
- Proprioseius retroacuminatus Zacarias & Moraes, 2001
- Proprioseius schichai Corpuz-Raros, 1994
