= Chelaseius austrellus =

Scientific classification
- Domain: Eukaryota
- Kingdom: Animalia
- Phylum: Arthropoda
- Subphylum: Chelicerata
- Class: Arachnida
- Order: Mesostigmata
- Family: Phytoseiidae
- Genus: Chelaseius
- Species: C. austrellus

Binomial name
- Chelaseius austrellus (Athias-Henriot, 1967)

Species of mite

Chelaseius austrellus is a species of mite in the family Phytoseiidae.
