= Proprioseiopsis genitalis =

Scientific classification
- Domain: Eukaryota
- Kingdom: Animalia
- Phylum: Arthropoda
- Subphylum: Chelicerata
- Class: Arachnida
- Order: Mesostigmata
- Family: Phytoseiidae
- Genus: Proprioseiopsis
- Species: P. genitalis

Binomial name
- Proprioseiopsis genitalis Karg, 1976

Species of mite

Proprioseiopsis genitalis is a species of mite in the family Phytoseiidae.
