= Okiseius wongi =

Scientific classification
- Kingdom: Animalia
- Phylum: Arthropoda
- Subphylum: Chelicerata
- Class: Arachnida
- Order: Mesostigmata
- Family: Phytoseiidae
- Genus: Okiseius
- Species: O. wongi

Binomial name
- Okiseius wongi Denmark & Kolodochka, 1996

Species of mite

Okiseius wongi is a species of mite in the family Phytoseiidae.
