= Proprioseiopsis belizensis =

Scientific classification
- Domain: Eukaryota
- Kingdom: Animalia
- Phylum: Arthropoda
- Subphylum: Chelicerata
- Class: Arachnida
- Order: Mesostigmata
- Family: Phytoseiidae
- Genus: Proprioseiopsis
- Species: P. belizensis

Binomial name
- Proprioseiopsis belizensis (Yoshida-Shaul & Chant, 1991)

Species of mite

Proprioseiopsis belizensis is a species of mite in the family Phytoseiidae.
