= Kampimodromus elongatus =

Scientific classification
- Kingdom: Animalia
- Phylum: Arthropoda
- Subphylum: Chelicerata
- Class: Arachnida
- Order: Mesostigmata
- Family: Phytoseiidae
- Genus: Kampimodromus
- Species: K. elongatus

Binomial name
- Kampimodromus elongatus (Oudemans, 1930)

Species of mite

Kampimodromus elongatus is a species of mite in the family Phytoseiidae.
