= Amblyseiulella heveae =

Scientific classification
- Kingdom: Animalia
- Phylum: Arthropoda
- Subphylum: Chelicerata
- Class: Arachnida
- Order: Mesostigmata
- Family: Phytoseiidae
- Genus: Amblyseiulella
- Species: A. heveae

Binomial name
- Amblyseiulella heveae (Oudemans, 1930)

Species of mite

Amblyseiulella heveae is a species of mite in the family Phytoseiidae.
