= Kampimodromus judaicus =

Scientific classification
- Domain: Eukaryota
- Kingdom: Animalia
- Phylum: Arthropoda
- Subphylum: Chelicerata
- Class: Arachnida
- Order: Mesostigmata
- Family: Phytoseiidae
- Genus: Kampimodromus
- Species: K. judaicus

Binomial name
- Kampimodromus judaicus (Swirski & Amitai, 1961)

Species of mite

Kampimodromus judaicus is a species of mite in the family Phytoseiidae.
