= Olpiseius djarradjin =

Scientific classification
- Domain: Eukaryota
- Kingdom: Animalia
- Phylum: Arthropoda
- Subphylum: Chelicerata
- Class: Arachnida
- Order: Mesostigmata
- Family: Phytoseiidae
- Genus: Olpiseius
- Species: O. djarradjin

Binomial name
- Olpiseius djarradjin Beard, 2001

Species of arachnid

Olpiseius djarradjin is a species of mite in the family Phytoseiidae.
