= Kampimodromus keae =

Scientific classification
- Domain: Eukaryota
- Kingdom: Animalia
- Phylum: Arthropoda
- Subphylum: Chelicerata
- Class: Arachnida
- Order: Mesostigmata
- Family: Phytoseiidae
- Genus: Kampimodromus
- Species: K. keae

Binomial name
- Kampimodromus keae (Papadoulis & Emmanouel, 1991)

Species of mite

Kampimodromus keae is a species of mite in the family Phytoseiidae.
