= Proprioseiopsis cabonus =

Scientific classification
- Domain: Eukaryota
- Kingdom: Animalia
- Phylum: Arthropoda
- Subphylum: Chelicerata
- Class: Arachnida
- Order: Mesostigmata
- Family: Phytoseiidae
- Genus: Proprioseiopsis
- Species: P. cabonus

Binomial name
- Proprioseiopsis cabonus (Schicha & Elshafie, 1980)

Species of mite

Proprioseiopsis cabonus is a species of mite in the family Phytoseiidae.
