= Phytoscutus acaridophagus =

Scientific classification
- Domain: Eukaryota
- Kingdom: Animalia
- Phylum: Arthropoda
- Subphylum: Chelicerata
- Class: Arachnida
- Order: Mesostigmata
- Family: Phytoseiidae
- Genus: Phytoscutus
- Species: P. acaridophagus

Binomial name
- Phytoscutus acaridophagus (Collyer, 1964)

Species of mite

Phytoscutus acaridophagus is a species of mite in the family Phytoseiidae.
