= Proprioseiopsis badryi =

Scientific classification
- Domain: Eukaryota
- Kingdom: Animalia
- Phylum: Arthropoda
- Subphylum: Chelicerata
- Class: Arachnida
- Order: Mesostigmata
- Family: Phytoseiidae
- Genus: Proprioseiopsis
- Species: P. badryi

Binomial name
- Proprioseiopsis badryi (Yousef & El-Brollosy, 1986)

Species of mite

Proprioseiopsis badryi is a species of mite in the family Phytoseiidae.
