= Swirskiseius =

Scientific classification
- Kingdom: Animalia
- Phylum: Arthropoda
- Subphylum: Chelicerata
- Class: Arachnida
- Order: Mesostigmata
- Family: Phytoseiidae
- Subfamily: Amblyseiinae
- Genus: Swirskiseius; Denmark & Evans, in Denmark, Evans, Aguilar, Vargas & Ochoa 1999

Genus of mites

Swirskiseius is a genus of mites in the Phytoseiidae family.

== Species ==
- Swirskiseius zamoranus Denmark & Evans, in Denmark, Evans, Aguilar, Vargas & Ochoa 1999
