= Amblyseiulella thoi =

Scientific classification
- Domain: Eukaryota
- Kingdom: Animalia
- Phylum: Arthropoda
- Subphylum: Chelicerata
- Class: Arachnida
- Order: Mesostigmata
- Family: Phytoseiidae
- Genus: Amblyseiulella
- Species: A. thoi

Binomial name
- Amblyseiulella thoi Ehara, 2002

Species of mite

Amblyseiulella thoi is a species of mite in the family Phytoseiidae.
