= Kampimodromus molle =

Scientific classification
- Domain: Eukaryota
- Kingdom: Animalia
- Phylum: Arthropoda
- Subphylum: Chelicerata
- Class: Arachnida
- Order: Mesostigmata
- Family: Phytoseiidae
- Genus: Kampimodromus
- Species: K. molle

Binomial name
- Kampimodromus molle (Ueckermann & Loots, 1985)

Species of mite

Kampimodromus molle is a species of mite in the family Phytoseiidae.
