= Quadromalus colombiensis =

Scientific classification
- Kingdom: Animalia
- Phylum: Arthropoda
- Subphylum: Chelicerata
- Class: Arachnida
- Order: Mesostigmata
- Family: Phytoseiidae
- Genus: Quadromalus
- Species: Q. colombiensis

Binomial name
- Quadromalus colombiensis Moraes, Denmark and Guerrero 1982

Species of mite

Quadromalus colombiensis is a species of arachnid found in Colombia.
