= Proprioseiopsis edbakeri =

Scientific classification
- Domain: Eukaryota
- Kingdom: Animalia
- Phylum: Arthropoda
- Subphylum: Chelicerata
- Class: Arachnida
- Order: Mesostigmata
- Family: Phytoseiidae
- Genus: Proprioseiopsis
- Species: P. edbakeri

Binomial name
- Proprioseiopsis edbakeri (Athias-Henriot, 1967)

Species of mite

Proprioseiopsis edbakeri is a species of mite in the family Phytoseiidae.
