= Chelaseius =

Scientific classification
- Kingdom: Animalia
- Phylum: Arthropoda
- Subphylum: Chelicerata
- Class: Arachnida
- Order: Mesostigmata
- Family: Phytoseiidae
- Subfamily: Amblyseiinae
- Genus: Chelaseius; Muma & Denmark, 1968

Genus of mites

Chelaseius is a genus of mites in the Phytoseiidae family.

== Species ==
- Chelaseius arnei Faraji & Karg, 2006
- Chelaseius austrellus (Athias-Henriot, 1967)
- Chelaseius brazilensis Denmark & Kolodochka, 1990
- Chelaseius caudatus Karg, 1983
- Chelaseius floridanus (Muma, 1955)
- Chelaseius freni Karg, 1976
- Chelaseius lativentris Karg, 1983
- Chelaseius schusterellus (Athias-Henriot, 1967)
- Chelaseius tundra (Chant & Hansell, 1971)
- Chelaseius valliculosus Kolodochka, 1987
- Chelaseius vicinus (Muma, 1965)
