= Eharius hymetticus =

Scientific classification
- Kingdom: Animalia
- Phylum: Arthropoda
- Subphylum: Chelicerata
- Class: Arachnida
- Order: Mesostigmata
- Family: Phytoseiidae
- Genus: Eharius
- Species: E. hymetticus

Binomial name
- Eharius hymetticus (Papadoulis & Emmanouel, 1991)

Species of mite

Eharius hymetticus is a species of mite in the family Phytoseiidae.
