= Kampimoseiulella reburrus =

Scientific classification
- Domain: Eukaryota
- Kingdom: Animalia
- Phylum: Arthropoda
- Subphylum: Chelicerata
- Class: Arachnida
- Order: Mesostigmata
- Family: Phytoseiidae
- Genus: Kampimoseiulella
- Species: K. reburrus

Binomial name
- Kampimoseiulella reburrus (van der Merwe, 1968)

Species of mite

Kampimoseiulella reburrus is a species of mite in the family Phytoseiidae.
