= Amblyseiulella paraheveae =

Scientific classification
- Domain: Eukaryota
- Kingdom: Animalia
- Phylum: Arthropoda
- Subphylum: Chelicerata
- Class: Arachnida
- Order: Mesostigmata
- Family: Phytoseiidae
- Genus: Amblyseiulella
- Species: A. paraheveae

Binomial name
- Amblyseiulella paraheveae (Wu & Ou, 2002)

Species of mite

Amblyseiulella paraheveae is a species of mite in the family Phytoseiidae.
