= Amblyseiulella =

Scientific classification
- Kingdom: Animalia
- Phylum: Arthropoda
- Subphylum: Chelicerata
- Class: Arachnida
- Order: Mesostigmata
- Family: Phytoseiidae
- Subfamily: Amblyseiinae
- Genus: Amblyseiulella; Muma, 1961

Genus of mites

Amblyseiulella is a genus of mites in the Phytoseiidae family.

== Species ==
- Amblyseiulella amanoi Ehara, in Ehara, Okada & Kato 1994
- Amblyseiulella baltazarae Corpuz-Raros, 1995
- Amblyseiulella chombongenis Ryu & Lee, 1995
- Amblyseiulella domatorum (Schicha, 1993)
- Amblyseiulella gapudi Corpuz-Raros, 1995
- Amblyseiulella heveae (Oudemans, 1930)
- Amblyseiulella hyauliangensis (Gupta, 1986)
- Amblyseiulella nucifera (Gupta, 1979)
- Amblyseiulella odowdi Ryu & Lee, 1995
- Amblyseiulella omei (Wu & Li, 1984)
- Amblyseiulella paraheveae (Wu & Ou, 2002)
- Amblyseiulella prunii (Liang & Ke, 1982)
- Amblyseiulella thoi Ehara, 2002
- Amblyseiulella xizangensis (Wu, 1997)
- Amblyseiulella yaeyamana Ehara & Amano, 2002
