= Amblyseiulella baltazarae =

Scientific classification
- Domain: Eukaryota
- Kingdom: Animalia
- Phylum: Arthropoda
- Subphylum: Chelicerata
- Class: Arachnida
- Order: Mesostigmata
- Family: Phytoseiidae
- Genus: Amblyseiulella
- Species: A. baltazarae

Binomial name
- Amblyseiulella baltazarae Corpuz-Raros, 1995

Species of mite

Amblyseiulella baltazarae is a species of mite in the family Phytoseiidae.

It was first described in 1995 by Corpuz-Raros.
