= Phytoscutus reunionensis =

Scientific classification
- Domain: Eukaryota
- Kingdom: Animalia
- Phylum: Arthropoda
- Subphylum: Chelicerata
- Class: Arachnida
- Order: Mesostigmata
- Family: Phytoseiidae
- Genus: Phytoscutus
- Species: P. reunionensis

Binomial name
- Phytoscutus reunionensis (Ueckermann & Loots, 1985)

Species of mite

Phytoscutus reunionensis is a species of mite in the family Phytoseiidae.
