= Okiseius himalayana =

Scientific classification
- Domain: Eukaryota
- Kingdom: Animalia
- Phylum: Arthropoda
- Subphylum: Chelicerata
- Class: Arachnida
- Order: Mesostigmata
- Family: Phytoseiidae
- Genus: Okiseius
- Species: O. himalayana

Binomial name
- Okiseius himalayana Gupta, 1986

Species of mite

Okiseius himalayana is a species of mite in the family Phytoseiidae.
