= Proprioseiopsis jugortus =

Scientific classification
- Kingdom: Animalia
- Phylum: Arthropoda
- Subphylum: Chelicerata
- Class: Arachnida
- Order: Mesostigmata
- Family: Phytoseiidae
- Genus: Proprioseiopsis
- Species: P. jugortus

Binomial name
- Proprioseiopsis jugortus (Athias-Henriot, 1966)

Species of mite

Proprioseiopsis jugortus is a species of mite in the family Phytoseiidae. It is found in Europe.
