= Phyllodromus trisetatus =

Scientific classification
- Kingdom: Animalia
- Phylum: Arthropoda
- Subphylum: Chelicerata
- Class: Arachnida
- Order: Mesostigmata
- Family: Phytoseiidae
- Genus: Phyllodromus
- Species: P. trisetatus

Binomial name
- Phyllodromus trisetatus Moraes & Melo, 1997

Species of mite

Phyllodromus trisetatus is a species of mite in the family Phytoseiidae.
