= Okiseius alniseius =

Scientific classification
- Kingdom: Animalia
- Phylum: Arthropoda
- Subphylum: Chelicerata
- Class: Arachnida
- Order: Mesostigmata
- Family: Phytoseiidae
- Genus: Okiseius
- Species: O. alniseius

Binomial name
- Okiseius alniseius Wainstein & Beglyarov, 1972

Species of mite

Okiseius alniseius is a species of mite in the family Phytoseiidae.
