= Proprioseiopsis donchanti =

Scientific classification
- Domain: Eukaryota
- Kingdom: Animalia
- Phylum: Arthropoda
- Subphylum: Chelicerata
- Class: Arachnida
- Order: Mesostigmata
- Family: Phytoseiidae
- Genus: Proprioseiopsis
- Species: P. donchanti

Binomial name
- Proprioseiopsis donchanti (Athias-Henriot, 1967)

Species of mite

Proprioseiopsis donchanti is a species of mite in the family Phytoseiidae.
