= Quadromalus =

Scientific classification
- Kingdom: Animalia
- Phylum: Arthropoda
- Subphylum: Chelicerata
- Class: Arachnida
- Order: Mesostigmata
- Family: Phytoseiidae
- Genus: Quadromalus; Moraes, Denmark & Guerrero, 1982

Genus of mites

Quadromalus is a genus of mites in the Phytoseiidae family.

== Species ==
- Quadromalus colombiensis Moraes, Denmark & Guerrero, 1982
