= Kampimoseiulella =

Scientific classification
- Kingdom: Animalia
- Phylum: Arthropoda
- Subphylum: Chelicerata
- Class: Arachnida
- Order: Mesostigmata
- Family: Phytoseiidae
- Genus: Kampimoseiulella; Chant & McMurtry, 2003

Genus of mites

Kampimoseiulella is a genus of mites in the Phytoseiidae family.

== Species ==
- Kampimoseiulella altusus (van der Merwe, 1968)
- Kampimoseiulella reburrus (van der Merwe, 1968)
