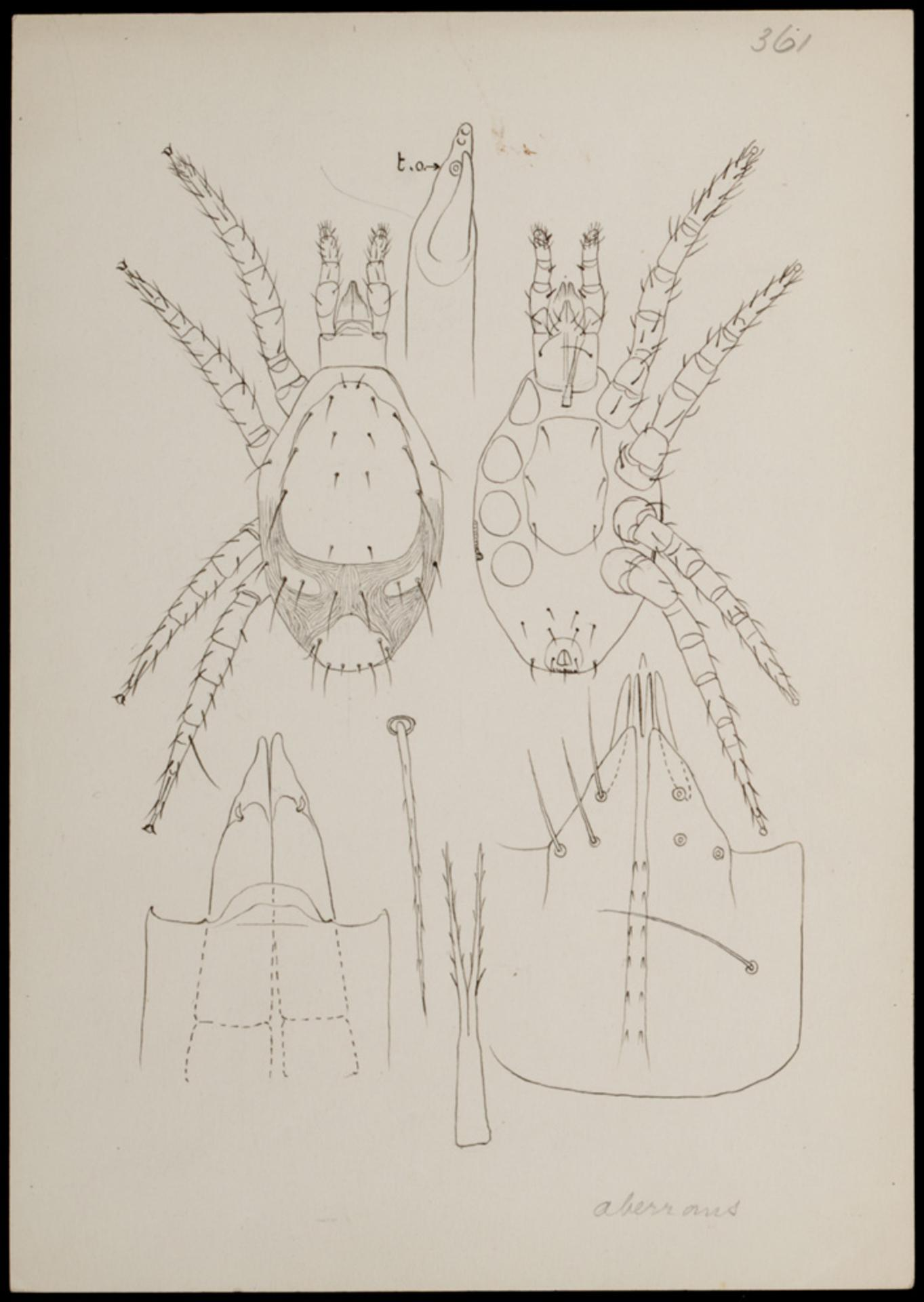
- Kampimodromus aberrans as Typhlodromus aberrans

Scientific classification
- Kingdom: Animalia
- Phylum: Arthropoda
- Subphylum: Chelicerata
- Class: Arachnida
- Order: Mesostigmata
- Family: Phytoseiidae
- Genus: Kampimodromus; Nesbitt, 1951

= Kampimodromus =

Genus of mites

Kampimodromus is a genus of mites in the Phytoseiidae family.

== Species ==
- Kampimodromus aberrans (Oudemans, 1930)
- Kampimodromus adrianae Ferragut & Pena-Estevez, 2003
- Kampimodromus alettae (Ueckermann & Loots, 1985)
- Kampimodromus coryli Meshkov, 1999
- Kampimodromus echii Ferragut & Pena-Estevez, 2003
- Kampimodromus elongatus (Oudemans, 1930)
- Kampimodromus ericinus Ragusa Di Chiara & Tsolakis, 1994
- Kampimodromus hmiminai McMurtry & Bounfour, 1989
- Kampimodromus judaicus (Swirski & Amitai, 1961)
- Kampimodromus keae (Papadoulis & Emmanouel, 1991)
- Kampimodromus langei Wainstein & Arutunjan, 1973
- Kampimodromus molle (Ueckermann & Loots, 1985)
- Kampimodromus ragusai Swirski & Amitai, 1997
