= Honduriella maxima =

Scientific classification
- Kingdom: Animalia
- Phylum: Arthropoda
- Subphylum: Chelicerata
- Class: Arachnida
- Order: Mesostigmata
- Family: Phytoseiidae
- Genus: Honduriella
- Species: H. maxima

Binomial name
- Honduriella maxima Denmark & Evans, 1999

Species of mite

Honduriella maxima is a species of mite in the family Phytoseiidae.
