= Okiseius =

Scientific classification
- Kingdom: Animalia
- Phylum: Arthropoda
- Subphylum: Chelicerata
- Class: Arachnida
- Order: Mesostigmata
- Family: Phytoseiidae
- Genus: Okiseius; Ehara, 1967

Genus of mites

Okiseius is a genus of mites in the Phytoseiidae family.

== Species ==
- Okiseius alniseius Wainstein & Beglyarov, 1972
- Okiseius chinensis Wu, in Wu & Qian 1983
- Okiseius cowbay Walter, 1999
- Okiseius eharai Liang & Ke, 1982
- Okiseius formosanus Tseng, 1972
- Okiseius himalayana Gupta, 1986
- Okiseius juglandis (Wang & Xu, 1985)
- Okiseius maritimus (Ehara, 1967)
- Okiseius morenoi Schicha, 1987
- Okiseius sikkimensis Gupta, 1986
- Okiseius subtropicus Ehara, 1967
- Okiseius tibetagramins (Wu, 1987)
- Okiseius tribulation Walter, 1999
- Okiseius wongi Denmark & Kolodochka, in Kolodochka & Denmark 1996
- Okiseius yazuliensis Gupta, 1986
