= Brahim Chergui =

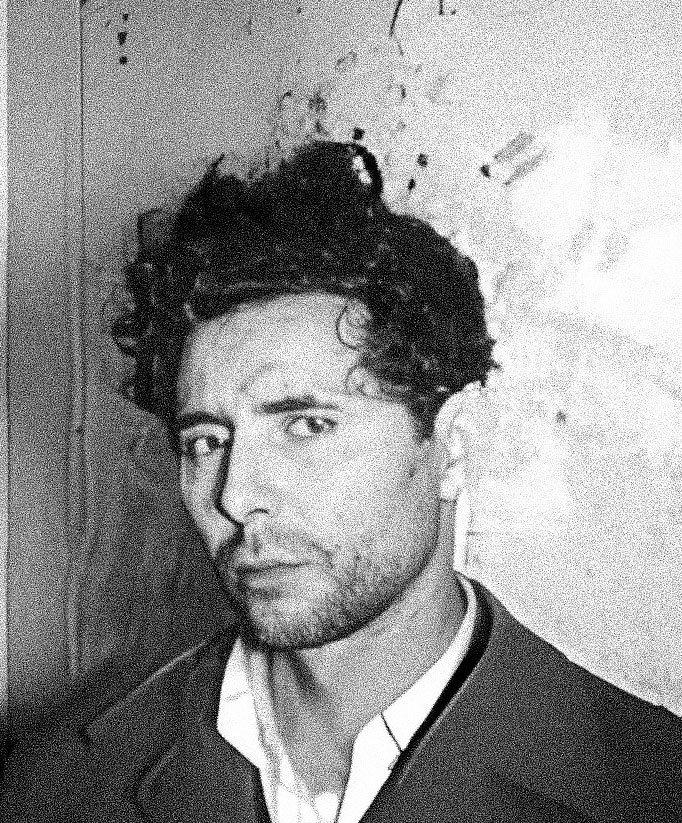
- Born: 1922; Aïn Khadra, French Algeria (now Algeria)
- Died: 7 January 2016 (aged 93–94); Algiers, Algeria
- Resting place: Algiers, Algeria
- Other names: H'mida
- Known for: Battle of Algiers
- Movement: FLN, OS

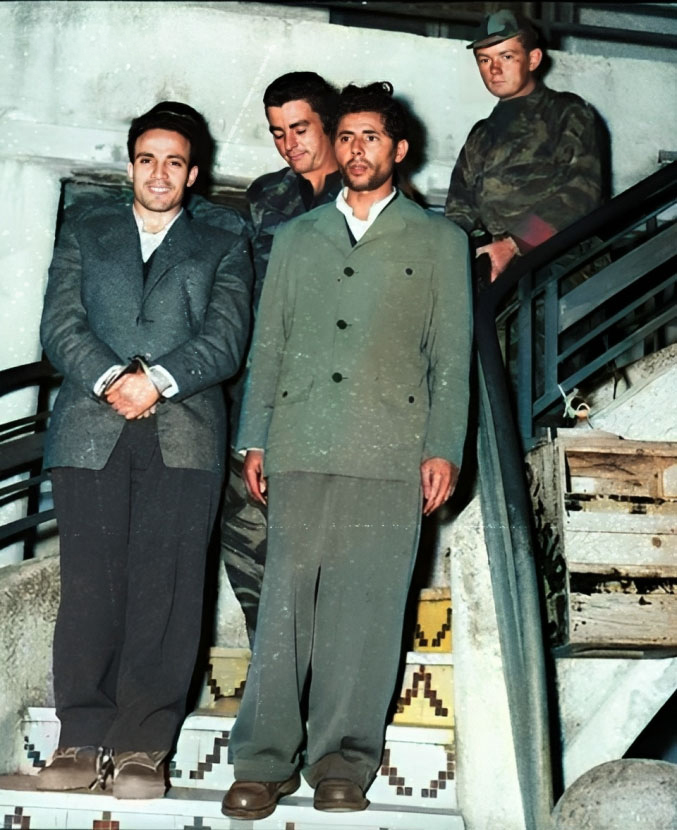
Arrest of Ben M'Hidi and Chergui Brahim during the Battle of Algiers 1957 - Algerian War of Independence

Brahim Chergui (1922 – 7 January 2016), known as H'mida was a revolutionary during the Algerian war of independence. He was the first leader of the Zone Autonome d'Alger (ZAA). Chergui was captured by French paratroopers on 23 February 1957. He was placed into the cell next door to Larbi Ben M'hidi. Chergui was severely tortured and was imprisoned in the Serkadji prison in Algiers until being released when Algeria gained independence in 1962. Chergui died at the age of 94 in Hôpital Militaire Aïn Naâdja, Algiers on 6 January 2016.
