= Olpiseius =

Scientific classification
- Domain: Eukaryota
- Kingdom: Animalia
- Phylum: Arthropoda
- Subphylum: Chelicerata
- Class: Arachnida
- Order: Mesostigmata
- Family: Phytoseiidae
- Genus: Olpiseius; Beard, 2001

Genus of mites

Olpiseius is a genus of mites in the Phytoseiidae family.

== Species ==
- Olpiseius djarradjin Beard, 2001
- Olpiseius noncollyerae (Schicha, 1987)
- Olpiseius perthae (McMurtry & Schicha, 1987)
