= Phyllodromus =

Scientific classification
- Kingdom: Animalia
- Phylum: Arthropoda
- Subphylum: Chelicerata
- Class: Arachnida
- Order: Mesostigmata
- Family: Phytoseiidae
- Genus: Phyllodromus; De Leon, 1959

Type species
- Phyllodromus leiodis De Leon, 1959

Genus of mites

Phyllodromus is a genus of mites in the Phytoseiidae family.

== Species ==
The genus Phyllodromus contains the following species:

- Phyllodromus leiodis De Leon, 1959
- Phyllodromus trisetatus Moraes & Melo, 1997
