= Typhlodromips =

Scientific classification
- Kingdom: Animalia
- Phylum: Arthropoda
- Subphylum: Chelicerata
- Class: Arachnida
- Order: Mesostigmata
- Family: Phytoseiidae
- Subfamily: Amblyseiinae
- Genus: Typhlodromips; De Leon, 1965

Genus of mites

Typhlodromips is a genus of mites in the Phytoseiidae family.

== Species ==
- Typhlodromips ablusus (Schuster & Pritchard, 1963)
- Typhlodromips aciculus (De Leon, 1967)
- Typhlodromips ainu (Ehara, 1967)
- Typhlodromips akahirai (Ehara, 1966)
- Typhlodromips akilinik (Chant & Hansell, 1971)
- Typhlodromips alpicola (Ehara, 1982)
- Typhlodromips altiplanumi (Ke & Xin, 1982)
- Typhlodromips amilus (De Leon, 1967)
- Typhlodromips andamanicus (Gupta, 1980)
- Typhlodromips annae (Schicha & Gutierrez, 1985)
- Typhlodromips anuwati (Ehara & Bhandhufalck, 1977)
- Typhlodromips arbuti (De Leon, 1961)
- Typhlodromips arcus (De Leon, 1966)
- Typhlodromips arcus (Ryu, 1998)
- Typhlodromips arecae (Gupta, 1977)
- Typhlodromips ariri (Gondim Jr. & Moraes, 2001)
- Typhlodromips artemis (Denmark & Evans, in Denmark, Evans, Aguilar, Vargas & Ochoa 1999)
- Typhlodromips asiaticus (Evans, 1953)
- Typhlodromips assamensis (Chant, 1960)
- Typhlodromips assiniboin (Chant & Hansell, 1971)
- Typhlodromips auratus (De Leon, 1966)
- Typhlodromips avetianae (Arutunjan & Ohandjanian, 1972)
- Typhlodromips azerbaijanicus (Abbasova, 1970)
- Typhlodromips baiyunensis (Wu, 1982)
- Typhlodromips bangalorensis (Karg, 1983)
- Typhlodromips beelarong (Schicha & Corpuz-Raros, 1992)
- Typhlodromips benavidesi (Denmark & Andrews, 1981)
- Typhlodromips biflorus (Denmark & Evans, in Denmark, Evans, Aguilar, Vargas & Ochoa 1999)
- Typhlodromips bladderae (Denmark & Evans, in Denmark, Evans, Aguilar, Vargas & Ochoa 1999)
- Typhlodromips brevibrachii (Karg & Oomen-Kalsbeek, 1987)
- Typhlodromips bryophilus (Karg, 1970)
- Typhlodromips cananeiensis (Gondim Jr. & Moraes, 2001)
- Typhlodromips cantonensis (Schicha, 1982)
- Typhlodromips clinopodii (Ke & Xin, 1982)
- Typhlodromips collinellus (Athias-Henriot, 1966)
- Typhlodromips compressus (Wu & Li, 1984)
- Typhlodromips confertus (De Leon, 1959)
- Typhlodromips cornuformis (Schicha & Corpuz-Raros, 1992)
- Typhlodromips cotoensis (Muma, 1961)
- Typhlodromips cristobalensis (De Leon, 1962)
- Typhlodromips crotalariae (Gupta, 1977)
- Typhlodromips culmulus (van der Merwe, 1968)
- Typhlodromips daviesi (De Leon, 1966)
- Typhlodromips decolor (Hirschmann, 1962)
- Typhlodromips deleoni (Muma, 1962)
- Typhlodromips dentilis (De Leon, 1959)
- Typhlodromips digitulus (Denmark, 1965)
- Typhlodromips dillus (De Leon, 1959)
- Typhlodromips dimidiatus (De Leon, 1962)
- Typhlodromips dombeyus (Denmark & Evans, in Denmark, Evans, Aguilar, Vargas & Ochoa 1999)
- Typhlodromips draconis (Chaudhri, Akbar & Rasool, 1979)
- Typhlodromips driggeri (Specht, 1968)
- Typhlodromips echium (Beard, 2001)
- Typhlodromips enab (El-Badry, 1967)
- Typhlodromips eucalypterus (Prasad, 1968)
- Typhlodromips euserratus (Karg, 1993)
- Typhlodromips extrasetus (Moraes, Oliveira & Zannou, 2001)
- Typhlodromips ficus (El-Halawany & Abdeul-Samad, 1990)
- Typhlodromips filipinus (Schicha & Corpuz-Raros, 1992)
- Typhlodromips fordycei (De Leon, 1959)
- Typhlodromips fragilis (Kolodochka & Bondarenko, 1993)
- Typhlodromips friendi (De Leon, 1967)
- Typhlodromips frutexis (Karg, 1991)
- Typhlodromips genya (Pritchard & Baker, 1962)
- Typhlodromips gimanthus (Beard, 2001)
- Typhlodromips gonzalezi (Moraes & Mesa, 1991)
- Typhlodromips grandiductus (McMurtry & Moraes, 1985)
- Typhlodromips guizhouensis (Wu & Ou, 1999)
- Typhlodromips hamiltoni (Chant & Yoshida-Shaul, 1978)
- Typhlodromips hapoliensis (Gupta, 1986)
- Typhlodromips heidrunae (McMurtry & Schicha, 1987)
- Typhlodromips helanensis (Wu & Lan, 1991)
- Typhlodromips hellougreus (Denmark & Muma, 1967)
- Typhlodromips heterochaetus (Liang & Ke, 1984)
- Typhlodromips hidakai (Ehara & Bhandhufalck, 1977)
- Typhlodromips hinoki (Ehara, 1972)
- Typhlodromips huanggangensis (Wu, 1986)
- Typhlodromips ibadanensis (Ueckermann & Loots, 1988)
- Typhlodromips ignotus (Beard, 2001)
- Typhlodromips ihalmiut (Chant & Hansell, 1971)
- Typhlodromips ishikawai (Ehara, 1972)
- Typhlodromips isthmus (Denmark & Evans, in Denmark, Evans, Aguilar, Vargas & Ochoa 1999)
- Typhlodromips japonicus (Ehara, 1958)
- Typhlodromips jianyangensis (Wu, 1981)
- Typhlodromips jimenezi (Denmark & Evans, in Denmark, Evans, Aguilar, Vargas & Ochoa 1999)
- Typhlodromips johoreae (Muma, 1967)
- Typhlodromips josephi (Yoshida-Shaul & Chant, 1991)
- Typhlodromips jucara (Gondim Jr. & Moraes, 2001)
- Typhlodromips kakaibaeus (Schicha & Corpuz-Raros, 1992)
- Typhlodromips krantzi (Chant, 1959)
- Typhlodromips labis (Corpuz-Raros & Rimando, 1966)
- Typhlodromips lambatinus (Schicha & Corpuz-Raros, 1992)
- Typhlodromips leei (Schicha & Corpuz-Raros, 1992)
- Typhlodromips linharis (El-Banhawy, 1984)
- Typhlodromips lugubris (Chant & Baker, 1965)
- Typhlodromips lutezhicus (Wainstein, 1972)
- Typhlodromips madorellus (Athias-Henriot, 1966)
- Typhlodromips malaphilippinensis (Schicha & Corpuz-Raros, 1992)
- Typhlodromips mangleae (De Leon, 1967)
- Typhlodromips markwelli (Schicha, 1979)
- Typhlodromips masseei (Nesbitt, 1951)
- Typhlodromips mastus (Denmark & Muma, 1967)
- Typhlodromips meghalayensis (Gupta, 1978)
- Typhlodromips montdorensis (Schicha, 1979)
- Typhlodromips multisetosus (McMurtry & Moraes, 1985)
- Typhlodromips muricatus (Charlet & McMurtry, 1977)
- Typhlodromips napaeus (Wainstein, 1978)
- Typhlodromips nectae (Denmark & Evans, in Denmark, Evans, Aguilar, Vargas & Ochoa 1999)
- Typhlodromips neoarcus (Moraes & Kreiter, in Moraes, Kreiter & Lofego 2000)
- Typhlodromips neoclavicus (Denmark & Evans, in Denmark, Evans, Aguilar, Vargas & Ochoa 1999)
- Typhlodromips neocrotalariae (Gupta, 1978)
- Typhlodromips neoghanii (Gupta, 1986)
- Typhlodromips neomarkwelli (Schicha, 1980)
- Typhlodromips nestorus (Beard, 2001)
- Typhlodromips newsami (Evans, 1953)
- Typhlodromips occidentafricanus (Moraes, Oliveira & Zannou, 2001
- Typhlodromips officinaria (Gupta, 1975)
- Typhlodromips oguroi (Ehara, 1964)
- Typhlodromips okinawanus (Ehara, 1967)
- Typhlodromips papuaensis (McMurtry & Moraes, 1985)
- Typhlodromips paulus (Denmark & Muma, 1973)
- Typhlodromips pederosus (El-Banhawy, 1978)
- Typhlodromips pinicolus (Karg, 1991)
- Typhlodromips plumosus (Denmark & Muma, 1975)
- Typhlodromips polyantheae (Gupta, 1975)
- Typhlodromips proximus (Kolodochka, 1991)
- Typhlodromips qinghaiensis (Wang & Xu, 1991)
- Typhlodromips quadridens (Karg & Oomen-Kalsbeek, 1987)
- Typhlodromips quercicolus (De Leon, 1959)
- Typhlodromips rademacheri (Dosse, 1958)
- Typhlodromips rangatensis (Gupta, 1977)
- Typhlodromips reptans (Blommers, 1974)
- Typhlodromips robustus (Chant & Baker, 1965)
- Typhlodromips rykei (Pritchard & Baker, 1962)
- Typhlodromips saacharus (Wu, 1981)
- Typhlodromips sabaculus (Denmark & Muma, 1973)
- Typhlodromips sabali (De Leon, 1959)
- Typhlodromips sanblasensis (De Leon, 1962)
- Typhlodromips sapienticola (Gupta, 1977)
- Typhlodromips scleroticus De Leon, 1966
- Typhlodromips sessor (De Leon, 1962)
- Typhlodromips shi (Pritchard & Baker, 1962)
- Typhlodromips shoreae (Gupta, 1977)
- Typhlodromips siamensis (Ehara & Bhandhufalck, 1977)
- Typhlodromips sichuanensis (Wu & Li, 1985)
- Typhlodromips sigridae (Schicha, 1982)
- Typhlodromips sijiensis (Gupta, 1986)
- Typhlodromips similis (Koch, 1839)
- Typhlodromips simplicissimus (De Leon, 1959)
- Typhlodromips sinensis (Denmark & Muma, 1972)
- Typhlodromips sottoi (Schicha & Corpuz-Raros, 1992)
- Typhlodromips spinigerus (Chant & Baker, 1965)
- Typhlodromips stilus (Karg & Oomen-Kalsbeek, 1987)
- Typhlodromips sturti (Schicha, 1980)
- Typhlodromips swirskii (Athias-Henriot, 1962)
- Typhlodromips syzygii (Gupta, 1975)
- Typhlodromips tanzaniensis (Yoshida-Shaul & Chant, 1988)
- Typhlodromips tennesseensis (De Leon, 1962)
- Typhlodromips tenuis (Hirschmann, 1962)
- Typhlodromips tetranychivorus (Gupta, 1978)
- Typhlodromips theae (Wu, 1983)
- Typhlodromips tibetapineus (Wu, 1987)
- Typhlodromips tibetasalicis (Wu, 1987)
- Typhlodromips tienhsainensis (Tseng, 1983)
- Typhlodromips tubus (Schuster, 1966)
- Typhlodromips vagatus (Denmark & Evans, in Denmark, Evans, Aguilar, Vargas & Ochoa 1999)
- Typhlodromips varius (Hirschmann, 1962)
- Typhlodromips vertunculus (Karg & Oomen-Kalsbeek, 1987)
- Typhlodromips vestificus (Tseng, 1976)
- Typhlodromips vignae (Liang & Ke, 1981)
- Typhlodromips vineaticus (Wainstein, 1978)
- Typhlodromips violini (Meyer & Rodrigues, 1966)
- Typhlodromips volgini (Wainstein & Beglyarov, 1971)
- Typhlodromips wunde (Schicha & Corpuz-Raros, 1992)
- Typhlodromips xui (Yin, Bei & Lu, 1992)
- Typhlodromips yandala (Schicha & Corpuz-Raros, 1992)
- Typhlodromips yarnde (Schicha & Corpuz-Raros, 1992)
- Typhlodromips yarra (Schicha & Corpuz-Raros, 1992)
- Typhlodromips yera (Schicha & Corpuz-Raros, 1992)
- Typhlodromips yerracharta (Schicha & Corpuz-Raros, 1992)
- Typhlodromips yunnanensis (Wu, 1984)
