= Proprioseiopsis =

Scientific classification
- Kingdom: Animalia
- Phylum: Arthropoda
- Subphylum: Chelicerata
- Class: Arachnida
- Order: Mesostigmata
- Family: Phytoseiidae
- Genus: Proprioseiopsis; Muma, 1961

Genus of mites

Proprioseiopsis is a genus of mites in the family Phytoseiidae.

== Species ==
- Proprioseiopsis acalyphae Denmark & Evans, in Denmark, Evans, Aguilar, Vargas & Ochoa 1999
- Proprioseiopsis acapius Karg, 1976
- Proprioseiopsis amotus (Zack, 1969)
- Proprioseiopsis amplus (Wainstein, 1983)
- Proprioseiopsis anthurii (Schicha, 1993)
- Proprioseiopsis antonellii Congdon, 2002
- Proprioseiopsis arunachalensis (Gupta, 1986)
- Proprioseiopsis asetus (Chant, 1959)
- Proprioseiopsis athiasae (Hirschmann, 1962)
- Proprioseiopsis badryi (Yousef & El-Brollosy, 1986)
- Proprioseiopsis basis Karg, 1994
- Proprioseiopsis bay (Schicha, 1980)
- Proprioseiopsis beatus (Chaudhri, 1968)
- Proprioseiopsis belizensis (Yoshida-Shaul & Chant, 1991)
- Proprioseiopsis bordjelaini (Athias-Henriot, 1966)
- Proprioseiopsis borealis (Chant & Hansell, 1971)
- Proprioseiopsis bregetovae (Abbasova, 1970)
- Proprioseiopsis bulga Chaudhri, Akbar & Rasool, 1979
- Proprioseiopsis cabonus (Schicha & Elshafie, 1980)
- Proprioseiopsis caliensis (Moraes & Mesa, 1988)
- Proprioseiopsis campanulus Karg, 1979
- Proprioseiopsis cannaensis (Muma, 1962)
- Proprioseiopsis carolinianus (Muma, Metz & Farrier, 1967)
- Proprioseiopsis catinus Karg, 1976
- Proprioseiopsis cephaeli (De Leon, 1967)
- Proprioseiopsis chilosus (van der Merwe, 1968)
- Proprioseiopsis circulus Tuttle & Muma, 1973
- Proprioseiopsis citri (Muma, 1962)
- Proprioseiopsis clausae (Muma, 1962)
- Proprioseiopsis coniferus (Prasad, 1968)
- Proprioseiopsis dacus (Wainstein, 1973)
- Proprioseiopsis dahonagnas (Schicha & Corpuz-Raros, 1992)
- Proprioseiopsis dentatus Chaudhri, Akbar & Rasool, 1979
- Proprioseiopsis detritus (Muma, 1961)
- Proprioseiopsis dominigos (El-Banhawy, 1984)
- Proprioseiopsis donchanti (Athias-Henriot, 1967)
- Proprioseiopsis dorsatus (Muma, 1961)
- Proprioseiopsis edbakeri (Athias-Henriot, 1967)
- Proprioseiopsis eudentatus Karg, 1989
- Proprioseiopsis euflagellatus Karg, 1983
- Proprioseiopsis eurynotus (van der Merwe, 1968)
- Proprioseiopsis euscutatus Karg, 1983
- Proprioseiopsis exitus (Schuster, 1966)
- Proprioseiopsis exopodalis (Kennett, 1958)
- Proprioseiopsis farallonicus (Moraes & Mesa, 1991)
- Proprioseiopsis ferratus Karg, 1976
- Proprioseiopsis fragariae (Kennett, 1958)
- Proprioseiopsis gallus Karg, 1989
- Proprioseiopsis gelikmani (Wainstein & Arutunjan, 1970)
- Proprioseiopsis genitalis Karg, 1976
- Proprioseiopsis gerezianus (Athias-Henriot, 1966)
- Proprioseiopsis globosus (Gonzalez & Schuster, 1962)
- Proprioseiopsis globosus Karg, 1976
- Proprioseiopsis gracilisetae (Muma, 1962)
- Proprioseiopsis grovesae (Chant, 1959)
- Proprioseiopsis guatemalensis (Chant, 1959)
- Proprioseiopsis hawaiiensis (Wainstein, 1983)
- Proprioseiopsis hudsonianus (Chant & Hansell, 1971)
- Proprioseiopsis inflatus (De Leon, 1965)
- Proprioseiopsis involutus Denmark & Knisley, in Knisley & Denmark 1978
- Proprioseiopsis iorgius Karg, 1976
- Proprioseiopsis isocaudarum Karg, 1993
- Proprioseiopsis jasmini (El-Banhawy, 1984)
- Proprioseiopsis jugortus (Athias-Henriot, 1966)
- Proprioseiopsis kogi (Chant & Hansell, 1971)
- Proprioseiopsis kopaeus (Schicha & Corpuz-Raros, 1992)
- Proprioseiopsis latocavi Karg, 1998
- Proprioseiopsis latoscutatus Karg, 1976
- Proprioseiopsis lenis (Corpuz-Raros & Rimando, 1966)
- Proprioseiopsis lepidus (Chant, 1959)
- Proprioseiopsis levani (Gomelauri, 1968)
- Proprioseiopsis lichenis (Chant, 1959)
- Proprioseiopsis lineatus (Wu & Lan, 1991)
- Proprioseiopsis marginatus Denmark, 1974
- Proprioseiopsis marrubiae Tuttle & Muma, 1973
- Proprioseiopsis mauiensis (Prasad, 1968)
- Proprioseiopsis messor (Wainstein, 1960)
- Proprioseiopsis mexicanus (Garman, 1958)
- Proprioseiopsis miconiae (Moraes & Mesa, 1991)
- Proprioseiopsis missouriensis Poe, 1970
- Proprioseiopsis mumaellus (Athias-Henriot, 1967)
- Proprioseiopsis mumamacrosetae (Hirschmann, 1962)
- Proprioseiopsis nemotoi (Ehara & Amano, 1998)
- Proprioseiopsis neomexicanus (Chant, 1959)
- Proprioseiopsis neotropicus (Ehara, 1966)
- Proprioseiopsis oblatus (Muma, 1961)
- Proprioseiopsis okanagensis (Chant, 1957)
- Proprioseiopsis oregonensis (Garman, 1958)
- Proprioseiopsis ovatus (Garman, 1958)
- Proprioseiopsis ovicinctus (Athias-Henriot, 1961)
- Proprioseiopsis pascuus (van der Merwe, 1968)
- Proprioseiopsis patellae Karg, 1989
- Proprioseiopsis penai Denmark & Evans, in Denmark, Evans, Aguilar, Vargas & Ochoa 1999
- Proprioseiopsis pentagonalis (Moraes & Mesa, 1991)
- Proprioseiopsis pentagonus (Wu & Lan, 1995)
- Proprioseiopsis penurisetus (Wainstein, 1960)
- Proprioseiopsis peruvianus (Moraes & Mesa, 1991)
- Proprioseiopsis phaseoloides Denmark & Evans, in Denmark, Evans, Aguilar, Vargas & Ochoa 1999
- Proprioseiopsis pocillatus (Athias-Henriot, 1961)
- Proprioseiopsis poculus Tuttle & Muma, 1973
- Proprioseiopsis popularis (De Leon, 1962)
- Proprioseiopsis praeanalis Karg, 1989
- Proprioseiopsis precipitans (De Leon, 1962)
- Proprioseiopsis pubes (Tseng, 1976)
- Proprioseiopsis pusillus (Kennett, 1963)
- Proprioseiopsis putmani (Chant, 1959)
- Proprioseiopsis putrephilus Meshkov, 1999
- Proprioseiopsis reventus (Zack, 1969)
- Proprioseiopsis rosellus (Chant, 1959)
- Proprioseiopsis rotundus (Muma, 1961)
- Proprioseiopsis sarraceniae (Muma, 1965)
- Proprioseiopsis scurra (Wainstein & Beglyarov, 1971)
- Proprioseiopsis septa (Garman, 1958)
- Proprioseiopsis sexsetosus (Fox, 1949)
- Proprioseiopsis sharkiensis Basha & Yousef, 1999
- Proprioseiopsis sharovi (Wainstein, 1975)
- Proprioseiopsis solens (De Leon, 1962)
- Proprioseiopsis sororculus (Wainstein, 1960)
- Proprioseiopsis sosninae (Wainstein, 1972)
- Proprioseiopsis synachattiensis (Gupta, 1985)
- Proprioseiopsis temperellus (Denmark & Muma, 1967)
- Proprioseiopsis temperus Tuttle & Muma, 1973
- Proprioseiopsis tenax (De Leon, 1967)
- Proprioseiopsis terrestris (Chant, 1959)
- Proprioseiopsis trilobae Denmark & Evans, in Denmark, Evans, Aguilar, Vargas & Ochoa 1999
- Proprioseiopsis tropicanus (Garman, 1958)
- Proprioseiopsis tubulus (Muma, 1965)
- Proprioseiopsis tulearensis (Blommers, 1976)
- Proprioseiopsis umidus Karg, 1989
- Proprioseiopsis unicus Denmark & Knisley, in Knisley & Denmark 1978
- Proprioseiopsis variocaudarum Karg, 1993
- Proprioseiopsis versutus (Zack, 1969)
- Proprioseiopsis vitreus Karg, 1998
- Proprioseiopsis vulgaris (Schuh, 1960)
- Proprioseiopsis weintraubi (Chant & Hansell, 1971)
