= Iphiseiodes =

Scientific classification
- Kingdom: Animalia
- Phylum: Arthropoda
- Subphylum: Chelicerata
- Class: Arachnida
- Order: Mesostigmata
- Family: Phytoseiidae
- Genus: Iphiseiodes; De Leon, 1966

Genus of mites

Iphiseiodes is a genus of mites in the Phytoseiidae family.

== Species ==
- Iphiseiodes kamahorae De Leon, 1966
- Iphiseiodes metapodalis (El-Banhawy, 1984)
- Iphiseiodes neonobilis Denmark & Muma, 1978
- Iphiseiodes nobilis (Chant & Baker, 1965)
- Iphiseiodes quadripilis (Banks, 1904)
- Iphiseiodes setillus Gondim Jr. & Moraes, 2001
- Iphiseiodes zuluagai Denmark & Muma, 1972
