= Phytoscutus =

Scientific classification
- Kingdom: Animalia
- Phylum: Arthropoda
- Subphylum: Chelicerata
- Class: Arachnida
- Order: Mesostigmata
- Family: Phytoseiidae
- Genus: Phytoscutus; Muma, 1961

Genus of mites

Phytoscutus is a genus of mites in the family Phytoseiidae.

== Species ==
The genus Phytoscutus contains the following species:

- Phytoscutus acaridophagus (Collyer, 1964)
- Phytoscutus bakeri (Gupta, 1980)
- Phytoscutus eugenus (Ueckermann & Loots, 1985)
- Phytoscutus glomus (Pritchard & Baker, 1962)
- Phytoscutus gongylus (Pritchard & Baker, 1962)
- Phytoscutus reunionensis (Ueckermann & Loots, 1985)
- Phytoscutus salebrosus (Chant, 1960)
- Phytoscutus sexpilis Muma, 1961
- Phytoscutus vaughni (Chant & Baker, 1965)
- Phytoscutus wiesei (Ueckermann & Loots, 1985)
- Phytoscutus wongsirii (Ehara & Bhandhufalck, 1977)
