= Chileseius =

Scientific classification
- Kingdom: Animalia
- Phylum: Arthropoda
- Subphylum: Chelicerata
- Class: Arachnida
- Order: Mesostigmata
- Family: Phytoseiidae
- Genus: Chileseius; Gonzalez & Schuster, 1962

Genus of mites

Chileseius is a genus of mites in the Phytoseiidae family.

== Species ==
- Chileseius camposi Gonzalez & Schuster, 1962
- Chileseius paracamposi Yoshida-Shaul & Chant, 1991
