= Typhlodromus combretum =

Scientific classification
- Kingdom: Animalia
- Phylum: Arthropoda
- Subphylum: Chelicerata
- Class: Arachnida
- Order: Mesostigmata
- Family: Phytoseiidae
- Genus: Typhlodromus
- Species: T. combretum

Binomial name
- Typhlodromus combretum McMurtry & Moraes, 1991

Species of predatory mite

Typhlodromus combretum is a species of predatory mite in the family Phytoseiidae. It was first described by James A. McMurtry and Gilberto José de Moraes in 1991.

The species belongs to the genus Typhlodromus, a large group of predatory mites known for feeding on other mites and small arthropods. Several members of the genus are important in biological control because they prey on pest species such as spider mites.

The specific epithet combretum is derived from the plant genus Combretum, suggesting an association with plants of that genus at the time of collection or description.

== Taxonomy ==
Typhlodromus combretum is placed within:

- Family: Phytoseiidae
- Subfamily: Typhlodrominae
- Genus: Typhlodromus

The family Phytoseiidae contains many predatory mite species associated with vegetation and agricultural ecosystems.

== Ecology ==
Like other phytoseiid mites, T. combretum is presumed to be predatory, feeding on smaller arthropods and mites inhabiting plant surfaces.
