= Gigagnathus =

Scientific classification
- Kingdom: Animalia
- Phylum: Arthropoda
- Subphylum: Chelicerata
- Class: Arachnida
- Order: Mesostigmata
- Family: Phytoseiidae
- Subfamily: Typhlodrominae
- Genus: Gigagnathus; Chant, 1965

Genus of mites

Gigagnathus is a genus of mites in the Phytoseiidae family.

== Species ==
- Gigagnathus extendus Chant, 1965
