= Silvaseius =

Scientific classification
- Kingdom: Animalia
- Phylum: Arthropoda
- Subphylum: Chelicerata
- Class: Arachnida
- Order: Mesostigmata
- Family: Phytoseiidae
- Subfamily: Typhlodrominae
- Genus: Silvaseius; Chant & McMurtry, 1994

Genus of mites

Silvaseius is a genus of mites in the Phytoseiidae family.

== Species ==
- Silvaseius barretoae (Yoshida-Shaul & Chant, 1991)
