= Typhloseiopsis =

Scientific classification
- Kingdom: Animalia
- Phylum: Arthropoda
- Subphylum: Chelicerata
- Class: Arachnida
- Order: Mesostigmata
- Family: Phytoseiidae
- Subfamily: Typhlodrominae
- Genus: Typhloseiopsis; De Leon, 1959

Genus of mites

Typhloseiopsis is a genus of mites in the Phytoseiidae family.

== Species ==
- Typhloseiopsis funiculatus De Leon, 1965
- Typhloseiopsis maryae McMurtry, 1983
- Typhloseiopsis neopritchardi Moraes & Mesa, 1988
- Typhloseiopsis pritchardi (Chant & Baker, 1965)
- Typhloseiopsis theodoliticus De Leon, 1959
