= Chantia =

Scientific classification
- Kingdom: Animalia
- Phylum: Arthropoda
- Subphylum: Chelicerata
- Class: Arachnida
- Order: Mesostigmata
- Family: Phytoseiidae
- Subfamily: Phytoseiinae
- Genus: Chantia; Pritchard & Baker, 1962

Genus of mites

Chantia is a genus of mites in the Phytoseiidae family.

== Species ==
- Chantia paradoxa Pritchard & Baker, 1962
