= Kuzinellus =

Scientific classification
- Kingdom: Animalia
- Phylum: Arthropoda
- Subphylum: Chelicerata
- Class: Arachnida
- Order: Mesostigmata
- Family: Phytoseiidae
- Subfamily: Typhlodrominae
- Genus: Kuzinellus; Wainstein, 1976

Genus of mites

Kuzinellus is a genus of mites in the Phytoseiidae family.

== Species ==
- Kuzinellus acanthus (van der Merwe, 1968)
- Kuzinellus additionalis Kolodochka, 1993
- Kuzinellus aditus (Parvez, Chaudhri & Ashfaq, 1994)
- Kuzinellus andreae
- Kuzinellus blairi (McMurtry & Moraes, 1991)
- Kuzinellus bregetovae (Wainstein & Beglyarov, 1972)
- Kuzinellus ecclesiasticus (De Leon, 1958)
- Kuzinellus elhariri (Bayan, 1988)
- Kuzinellus febriculus (Ueckermann & Loots, 1984)
- Kuzinellus ignavus (Chaudhri, Akbar & Rassol, 1974)
- Kuzinellus kuzini (Wainstein, 1962)
- Kuzinellus loricatus Wainstein, 1978
- Kuzinellus meritus (Parvez, Chaudhri & Ashfaq, 1994)
- Kuzinellus neosentus (van der Merwe, 1968)
- Kuzinellus neosoleiger (Gupta, 1981)
- Kuzinellus niloticus (El-Badry, 1967)
- Kuzinellus obsis (Ueckermann & Loots, 1988)
- Kuzinellus operantis (Chaudhri, Akbar & Rassol, 1974)
- Kuzinellus parvus (Denmark & Matthysse, in Matthysse & Denmark 1981)
- Kuzinellus prunusus (van der Merwe, 1968)
- Kuzinellus querellus (Ueckermann & Loots, 1988)
- Kuzinellus relentus (Denmark & Matthysse, in Matthysse & Denmark 1981)
- Kuzinellus saharae McMurtry & Bounfour, 1989
- Kuzinellus scytinus (Chazeau, 1970)
- Kuzinellus sennarensis (El-Badry, 1967)
- Kuzinellus sentus (Pritchard & Baker, 1962)
- Kuzinellus sursum (Parvez, Chaudhri & Ashfaq, 1994)
- Kuzinellus torulosus Kuznetsov, 1994
- Kuzinellus trisetus (Wu, Lan & Zhang, 1992)
- Kuzinellus vitreus (Chaudhri, Akbar & Rassol, 1974)
- Kuzinellus wentzeli (Ueckermann & Loots, 1988)
- Kuzinellus yokogawae (Ehara & Hamaoka, 1980)
