= Typhloseiulus =

Scientific classification
- Kingdom: Animalia
- Phylum: Arthropoda
- Subphylum: Chelicerata
- Class: Arachnida
- Order: Mesostigmata
- Family: Phytoseiidae
- Subfamily: Typhlodrominae
- Genus: Typhloseiulus; Chant & McMurtry, 1994

Genus of mites

Typhloseiulus is a genus of mites in the Phytoseiidae family.

== Species ==
- Typhloseiulus arzakanicus (Arutunjan, 1972)
- Typhloseiulus calabriae (Ragusa & Swirski, 1976)
- Typhloseiulus carmonae (Chant & Yoshida-Shaul, 1983)
- Typhloseiulus eleonorae (Ragusa & Swirski, 1981)
- Typhloseiulus eliahuswirskii (Ragusa Di Chiara, 1992)
- Typhloseiulus erymanthii (Papadoulis & Emmanouel, 1988)
- Typhloseiulus peculiaris (Kolodochka, 1980)
- Typhloseiulus rodopiensis (Papadoulis & Emmanouel, 1994)
- Typhloseiulus simplex (Chant, 1956)
- Typhloseiulus subsimplex (Arutunjan, 1972)
