= Chanteius =

Scientific classification
- Kingdom: Animalia
- Phylum: Arthropoda
- Subphylum: Chelicerata
- Class: Arachnida
- Order: Mesostigmata
- Family: Phytoseiidae
- Subfamily: Typhlodrominae
- Genus: Chanteius; Wainstein, 1962

Genus of mites

Chanteius is a genus of mites in the Phytoseiidae family.

== Species ==
- Chanteius apoensis (Schicha & Corpuz-Raros, 1992)
- Chanteius contiguus (Chant, 1959)
- Chanteius guangdongensis Wu & Lan, 1992
- Chanteius hainanensis Wu & Lan, 1992
- Chanteius makapalus (Schicha & Corpuz-Raros, 1992)
- Chanteius nabiyakus (Schicha & Corpuz-Raros, 1992)
- Chanteius parisukatus (Schicha & Corpuz-Raros, 1992)
- Chanteius separatus (Wu & Li, 1985)
- Chanteius tengi (Wu & Li, 1985)
