= Paraseiulus =

Scientific classification
- Kingdom: Animalia
- Phylum: Arthropoda
- Subphylum: Chelicerata
- Class: Arachnida
- Order: Mesostigmata
- Family: Phytoseiidae
- Subfamily: Typhlodrominae
- Genus: Paraseiulus; Muma, 1961

Genus of mites

Paraseiulus is a genus of mites in the Phytoseiidae family.

== Species ==
- Paraseiulus deogyuensis (Ryu & Ehara, 1990)
- Paraseiulus erevanicus Wainstein & Arutunjan, 1967
- Paraseiulus inobservatus Kolodochka, 1983
- Paraseiulus insignis Kolodochka, 1983
- Paraseiulus intermixtus Kolodochka, 1983
- Paraseiulus jirofticus Daneshvar, 1987
- Paraseiulus minutus Athias-Henriot, 1978
- Paraseiulus porosus Kolodochka, 1980
- Paraseiulus soleiger (Ribaga, 1904)
- Paraseiulus talbii (Athias-Henriot, 1960)
- Paraseiulus triporus (Chant & Yoshida-Shaul, 1982)
- Paraseiulus yugoslavicus (Mijuskovic & Tomasevic, 1975)
