= T. vulgaris =

T. vulgaris may refer to:

- Tylenchorhynchus vulgaris, a plant pathogenic nematode species
- Typhlodromus vulgaris, a predatory mite species

== See also ==
- Vulgaris (disambiguation)
