= Meyerius =

Scientific classification
- Kingdom: Animalia
- Phylum: Arthropoda
- Subphylum: Chelicerata
- Class: Arachnida
- Order: Mesostigmata
- Family: Phytoseiidae
- Subfamily: Typhlodrominae
- Genus: Meyerius van der Merwe, 1968

Genus of mites

Meyerius is a genus of mites in the Phytoseiidae family.

== Species ==
- Meyerius agrostidis (van der Merwe, 1968)
- Meyerius chaetopus (van der Merwe, 1968)
- Meyerius citimus (van der Merwe, 1968)
- Meyerius collativus (van der Merwe, 1968)
- Meyerius convallis (van der Merwe, 1968)
- Meyerius egregius (van der Merwe, 1968)
- Meyerius fistella (Ueckermann & Loots, 1984)
- Meyerius heindrichi (Ueckermann & Loots, 1984)
- Meyerius immutatus (van der Merwe, 1968)
- Meyerius incisus (van der Merwe, 1968)
- Meyerius keetchi (Ueckermann & Loots, 1984)
- Meyerius latus (van der Merwe, 1968)
- Meyerius liliaceus (van der Merwe, 1968)
- Meyerius litus (Ueckermann & Loots, 1984)
- Meyerius maritimus (van der Merwe, 1968)
- Meyerius veretillum (van der Merwe, 1968)
- Meyerius zantedeschiae (van der Merwe, 1968)
