= Galendromimus =

Scientific classification
- Kingdom: Animalia
- Phylum: Arthropoda
- Subphylum: Chelicerata
- Class: Arachnida
- Order: Mesostigmata
- Family: Phytoseiidae
- Subfamily: Typhlodrominae
- Genus: Galendromimus; Muma, 1961

Genus of mites

Galendromimus is a genus of mites in the Phytoseiidae family.

== Species ==
- Galendromimus alveolaris (De Leon, 1957)
- Galendromimus borinquensis (De Leon, 1965)
- Galendromimus multipoculi Zacarias, Moraes & McMurtry, 2002
- Galendromimus paulista Zacarias & Moraes, 2001
- Galendromimus sanctus De Leon, 1967
- Galendromimus tunapunensis De Leon, 1967
