= Cocoseius =

Scientific classification
- Kingdom: Animalia
- Phylum: Arthropoda
- Subphylum: Chelicerata
- Class: Arachnida
- Order: Mesostigmata
- Family: Phytoseiidae
- Subfamily: Typhlodrominae
- Genus: Cocoseius; Denmark & Andrews, 1981

Genus of mites

Cocoseius is a genus of mites in the family Phytoseiidae.

== Species ==
- Cocoseius elsalvador Denmark & Andrews, 1981
- Cocoseius palmarum Gondim Jr., Moraes & McMurtry, 2000
