= C8orf82 =

Identifiers
- Aliases: C8orf82, chromosome 8 open reading frame 82
- External IDs: MGI: 1925941; GeneCards: C8orf82

Gene location (Human)
Chr.	Chromosome 8 (human)
Band	8q24.3	Start	144,525,733 bp
Band	8q24.3	End	144,529,132 bp

Gene location (Mouse)
Chr.	Chromosome 15 (mouse)
Band	15|15 D3	Start	76,605,665 bp
Band	15|15 D3	End	76,608,045 bp
RNA expression pattern
Bgee	Human / Mouse (ortholog); Top expressed in: mucosa of ileum; parotid gland; pancreatic ductal cell; right lobe of liver; apex of heart; mucosa of transverse colon; myocardium of left ventricle; renal cortex; human kidney; prostate / Top expressed in: brown adipose tissue; muscle of thigh; right kidney; myocardium of ventricle; medial head of gastrocnemius muscle; skeletal muscle tissue; left lobe of liver; proximal tubule; temporal muscle; digastric muscle; More reference expression data
BioGPS	n/a
Orthologs
Databases	NCBI: entry; OMA: entry
Species	Human	Mouse
Entrez	414919	223665
Ensembl	ENSG00000213563	ENSMUSG00000116138
UniProt	Q6P1X6	Q8VE95
RefSeq (mRNA)	NM_001001795	NM_145472; NM_176828
RefSeq (protein)	NP_001001795	NP_663447; NP_789798
Location (UCSC)	Chr 8: 144.53 – 144.53 Mb	Chr 15: 76.61 – 76.61 Mb
PubMed search
- Wikidata
View/Edit Human	View/Edit Mouse

Chromosome 8 open reading frame 82 is a protein encoded in humans by the C8orf82 gene.

== Gene ==
C8orf82 is a gene located on the minus strand of chromosome 8 in the species Homo sapiens at locus 8q24. The gene is 3,400 bases long and contains 3 exons.

== mRNA ==
The mRNA produced by the C8orf82 gene is 1,979 base pairs long with coding sequence that starts at base 159 and ends at base 809. According to NCBI Gene there are no alternative transcripts or isoforms. AceView lists several alternative transcripts and isoforms, the existence of which is uncertain.

== Homology ==
C8orf82 is conserved among invertebrates, fish, reptiles, mammals, and protists. C8orf82 was not found to be conserved among bacteria, archaea, plants, fungi, or trichoplax. The domain of unknown function DUF4505 seems to be well conserved among most orthologs.

=== Orthologs ===
Below is a table of orthologs obtained using Blast.

Common name	Genus & species	Date of divergence from humans (MYA)	Accession number	Sequence length (AA)	Sequence identity to humans	Sequence similarity to humans
Chimpanzee	Pan troglodytes	6.6	NP_001233407	216	98%	98%
Little brown bat	Myotis lucifugus	97.5	XP_006107626	157	91%	92%
Wild boar	Sus scrofa	97.5	XP_013851838	269	53%	56%
Peregrine falcon	Falco peregrinus	320.5	XP_013149891	205	70%	76%
Burmese python	Python bivittatus	320.5	XP_007436434	201	64%	75%
Schlegel's Japanese gecko	Gekko japonicus	320.5	XP_015273778	214	65%	74%
Crested ibis	Nipponia nippon	320.5	XP_009466919	168	66%	72%
Rock dove	Columba livia	320.5	XP_013226589	159	59%	67%
Kiwi bird	Apteryx australis mantelli	320.5	XP_013800585	318	55%	64%
Green turtle	Chelonia mydas	320.5	XP_007063392	188	52%	64%
Blind cave fish	Astyanax mexicanus	429.6	XP_007255700	217	63%	75%
Black cod	Notothenia coriiceps	429.6	XP_010788219	237	61%	71%
Sheepshead minnow	Cyprinodon variegatus	429.6	XP_015227424	166	57%	65%
Sea urchin	Strongylocentrotus purpuratus	747.8	XP_784244	265	54%	72%
Swallowtail butterfly	Papilio polytes	847	XP_013133745	166	52	72
Honey bee	Apis mellifera	847	XP_393829.2	220	50%	64%
Mite	Metaseiulus occidentalis	847	XP_003744318	211	42%	60%
Sponge	Amphimedon queenslandica	936	XP_003384611	215	47%	62%
Protozoa	Tetrahymena thermophila	1724.7	XP_001015777.2	208	30%	46%
Protist	Thecamonas trahens	???	XP_013760738	237	32%	44%

=== Evolutionary history ===
C8orf82 does not belong to a specific gene family and has no other known alternative splice isoforms. This holds true for its most distant ancestor as well.

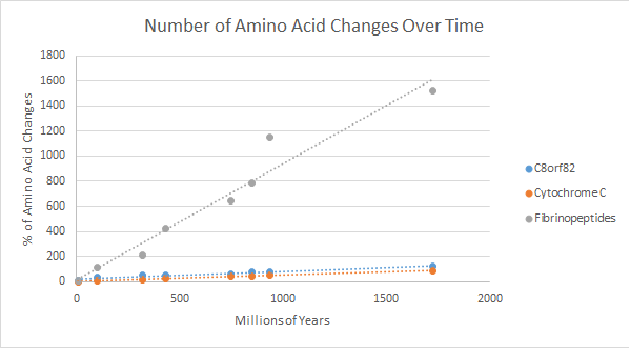
Comparison of C8orf82's % of amino acid changes over time to that of cytochrome c and fibrinogen. Generated using data from ortholog table.

The above graph show's how the behavior of C8orf82's percent of amino acid changes over time is similar to that of fibrinogen and vastly different from cytochrome c indicating a very slow rate of change over time.

Below is a graph that depicts the percent identity change of the orthologs listed in the ortholog table based on the orthologs dates of divergence.

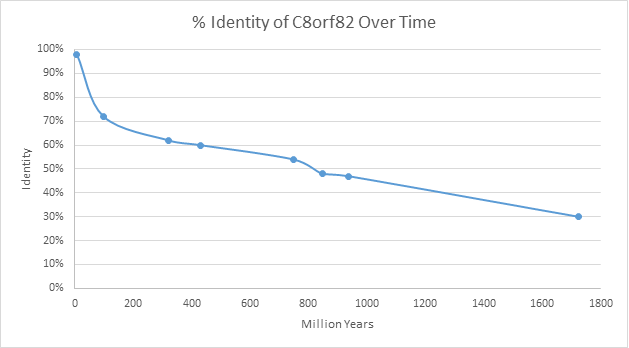
C8orf82's orthologs percent identity change over time based on date of divergence.

== Protein ==
The C8orf82 gene encodes for the protein termed UPF0598 protein C8orf82 or just C8orf82.

=== General properties ===
The protein is 216 amino acids long and contains a domain of unknown function DUF4505. This domain of unknown function is also known as pfam14956. The protein has a molecular weight of 23.8 kDa and an isoelectric point of 9.36.

=== Compositional features ===
Isoleucine (0.5%) and lysine (1.4%) within C8orf82 were found to occur in lower frequencies compared to other normal human proteins, while proline(9.7%) and arginine (10.6%) had slightly higher occurrence frequencies.

=== Post-translational modifications ===
Predicted post-translational modifications based on ExPASy tests include phosphorylation sites at several serines, threonines, and tyrosines. In addition tyrosine sulfation, sumoylation, O-linked glycosylation, O-ß-GlcNAc attachment sites and an NES motif was also detected.

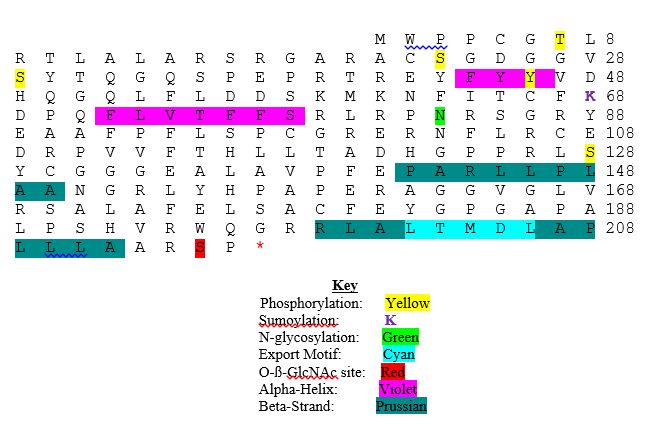
A conceptual translation of UPF0598 protein C8orf82 showing post translation modifications and secondary structure.

=== Subcellular localization ===
C8orf82 is predicted to be localized within the mitochondria using PSORT II analysis. The results of a k-NN prediction attributed 60.9% to mitochondrial localization and 26.1% to nuclear localization.

=== Interacting proteins ===
ETFA has been shown to interact with C8orf82 using high-throughput affinity-purification mass spectrometry.

== Expression ==
Using antibody staining, most normal cells showed moderate cytoplasmic and nuclear immunoreactivity. Strong staining was observed in placental trophoblasts. Lymphoid tissues, glial cells and myocytes were weakly stained or negative. A staining analysis was also done on cancer cells and the results were as follows; a majority of malignant cells displayed weak to moderate positivity. Many cases of malignant carcinoids and lymphomas were negative. In all these tests, only a single antibody was used (CAB034331).

Microarray data has shown C8orf82 to be ubiquitously expressed.

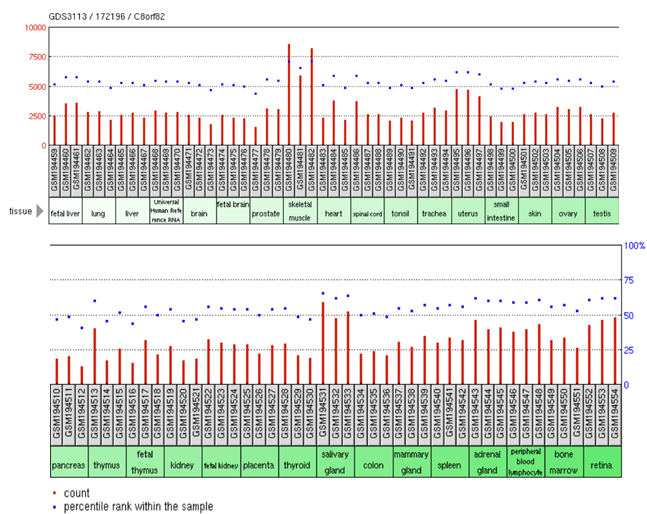
Microarray data for C8orf82 throughout normal human tissues.

An EST profile for C8orf82 also shows ubiquitous expression.

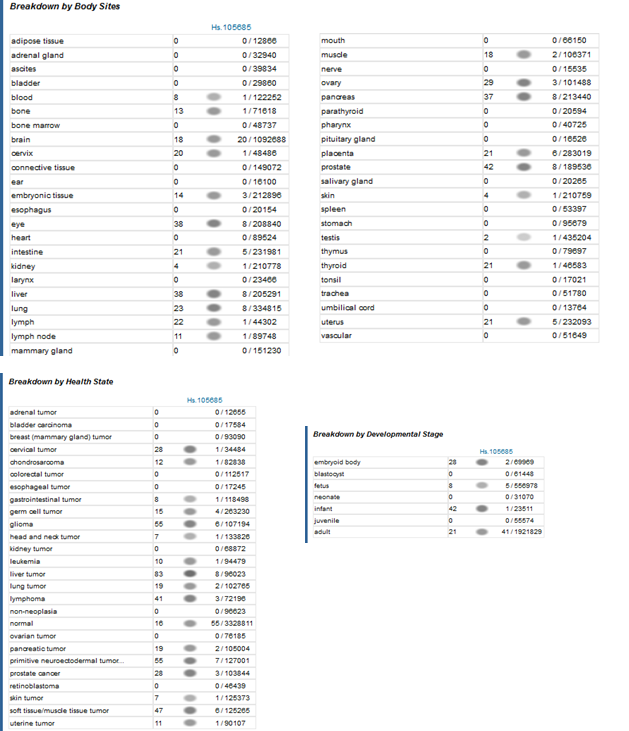
EST profile for C8orf82 taken from Unigene.
