= Typhlodromina =

Scientific classification
- Kingdom: Animalia
- Phylum: Arthropoda
- Subphylum: Chelicerata
- Class: Arachnida
- Order: Mesostigmata
- Family: Phytoseiidae
- Subfamily: Typhlodrominae
- Genus: Typhlodromina; Muma, 1961

Genus of mites

Typhlodromina is a genus of mites in the Phytoseiidae family.

== Species ==
- Typhlodromina conspicua (Garman, 1948)
- Typhlodromina eharai Muma & Denmark, 1969
- Typhlodromina musero (Schicha, 1987)
- Typhlodromina subtropica Muma & Denmark, 1969
- Typhlodromina tropica (Chant, 1959)
