= Galendromus =

Scientific classification
- Kingdom: Animalia
- Phylum: Arthropoda
- Subphylum: Chelicerata
- Class: Arachnida
- Order: Mesostigmata
- Family: Phytoseiidae
- Subfamily: Typhlodrominae
- Genus: Galendromus; Muma, 1961

Genus of mites

Galendromus is a genus of mites in the Phytoseiidae family.

== Species ==
- Galendromus annectens (De Leon, 1958)
- Galendromus deceptus (Chant & Yoshida-Shaul, 1984)
- Galendromus ferrugineus De Leon, 1962
- Galendromus helveolus (Chant, 1959)
- Galendromus longipilus (Nesbitt, 1951)
- Galendromus occidentalis (Nesbitt, 1951)
- Galendromus pilosus (Chant, 1959)
- Galendromus porresi (McMurtry, 1983)
- Galendromus superstus Zack, 1969
- Galendromus carinulatus (De Leon, 1959)
- Galendromus hondurensis Denmark & Evans, in Denmark, Evans, Aguilar, Vargas & Ochoa 1999
- Galendromus pinnatus (Schuster & Pritchard, 1963)
- Galendromus reticulus Tuttle & Muma, 1973
