= Cydnoseius =

Scientific classification
- Kingdom: Animalia
- Phylum: Arthropoda
- Subphylum: Chelicerata
- Class: Arachnida
- Order: Mesostigmata
- Family: Phytoseiidae
- Subfamily: Typhlodrominae
- Genus: Cydnoseius; Muma, 1967

Genus of mites

Cydnoseius is a genus of mites in the Phytoseiidae family.

== Species ==
- Cydnoseius muntius (Schicha & Corpuz-Raros, 1992)
- Cydnoseius negevi (Swirski & Amitai, 1961)
