= Platyseiella =

Scientific classification
- Kingdom: Animalia
- Phylum: Arthropoda
- Subphylum: Chelicerata
- Class: Arachnida
- Order: Mesostigmata
- Family: Phytoseiidae
- Subfamily: Phytoseiinae
- Genus: Platyseiella; Muma, 1961

Genus of mites

Platyseiella is a genus of peditory mites in the Phytoseiidae family.

== Species ==
- Platyseiella acuta Ehara, 2002
- Platyseiella eliahui Ueckermann, 1992
- Platyseiella longicervicalis (Moraes & Denmark, 1989)
- Platyseiella marikae Ueckermann, 1990
- Platyseiella mumai Ray & Gupta, 1981
- Platyseiella platypilis (Chant, 1959)
