= Neoseiulella =

Scientific classification
- Kingdom: Animalia
- Phylum: Arthropoda
- Subphylum: Chelicerata
- Class: Arachnida
- Order: Mesostigmata
- Family: Phytoseiidae
- Subfamily: Typhlodrominae
- Genus: Neoseiulella; Muma, 1961

Genus of mites

Neoseiulella is a genus of mites in the Phytoseiidae family.

== Species ==
- Neoseiulella aceri (Collyer, 1957)
- Neoseiulella armidalensis (Schicha & Elshafie, 1980)
- Neoseiulella arutunjani (Kuznetsov, 1984)
- Neoseiulella ashleyae (Chant & Yoshida-Shaul, 1989)
- Neoseiulella canariensis Ferragut & Pena-Estevez, 2003
- Neoseiulella carmeli (Rivnay & Swirski, 1980)
- Neoseiulella cassiniae (Collyer, 1982)
- Neoseiulella celtis Denmark & Rather, 1996
- Neoseiulella compta (Corpuz-Raros, 1966)
- Neoseiulella coreen Walter, 1997
- Neoseiulella corrugata (Schicha, 1983)
- Neoseiulella cottieri (Collyer, 1964)
- Neoseiulella crassipilis (Athias-Henriot & Fauvel, 1981)
- Neoseiulella dachanti (Collyer, 1964)
- Neoseiulella elaeocarpi (Schicha, 1993)
- Neoseiulella eleglidus (Tseng, 1983)
- Neoseiulella elongata Ferragut & Pena-Estevez, 2003
- Neoseiululla farraguti Moraza & Pena-Estevez, 2006
- Neoseiulella litoralis (Swirski & Amitai, 1984)
- Neoseiulella manukae (Collyer, 1964)
- Neoseiulella montforti (Rivnay & Swirski, 1980)
- Neoseiulella myopori (Collyer, 1982)
- Neoseiulella nesbitti (Womersley, 1954)
- Neoseiulella novaezealandiae (Collyer, 1964)
- Neoseiulella oleariae (Collyer, 1982)
- Neoseiulella perforata (Athias-Henriot, 1960)
- Neoseiulella runiacus (Kolodochka, 1980)
- Neoseiulella schusteri (Yousef & El-Brollosy, 1986)
- Neoseiulella spaini (Collyer, 1982)
- Neoseiulella splendida Ferragut & Pena-Estevez, 2003
- Neoseiulella steeli (Schicha & McMurtry, 1986)
- Neoseiulella steveni (Schicha, 1987)
- Neoseiulella tiliarum (Oudemans, 1930)
- Neoseiulella tuberculata (Wainstein, 1958)
- Neoseiulella vollsella (Chaudhri, Akbar & Rassol, 1974)
