= Australiseiulus =

Scientific classification
- Kingdom: Animalia
- Phylum: Arthropoda
- Subphylum: Chelicerata
- Class: Arachnida
- Order: Mesostigmata
- Family: Phytoseiidae
- Subfamily: Typhlodrominae
- Genus: Australiseiulus; Muma, 1961

Genus of mites

Australiseiulus is a genus of mites in the Phytoseiidae family.

== Species ==
- Australiseiulus angophorae (Schicha, 1981)
- Australiseiulus australicus (Womersley, 1954)
- Australiseiulus dewi Beard, 1999
- Australiseiulus goondi Beard, 1999
- Australiseiulus laterisetus Moraes, Oliveira & Zannou, 2001
- Australiseiulus poplar Beard, 1999
