= Phytoseiinae =

Scientific classification
- Kingdom: Animalia
- Phylum: Arthropoda
- Subphylum: Chelicerata
- Class: Arachnida
- Order: Mesostigmata
- Family: Phytoseiidae
- Subfamily: Phytoseiinae; Berlese, 1916

Subfamily of mites

The Phytoseiinae are a subfamily of predatory mites in the Phytoseiidae family.

== Genera ==
The subfamily Phytoseiinae contains these genera:

- Chantia Pritchard & Baker, 1962
- Phytoseius Ribaga, 1904
- Platyseiella Muma, 1961
