= Typhlodromus =

Scientific classification
- Domain: Eukaryota
- Kingdom: Animalia
- Phylum: Arthropoda
- Subphylum: Chelicerata
- Class: Arachnida
- Order: Mesostigmata
- Family: Phytoseiidae
- Genus: Typhlodromus; Scheuten, 1857

Genus of mites

Typhlodromus is a genus of predatory mites belonging to the family Phytoseiidae. Members of this genus feed largely on other mites, such as red spider mites, and several species that are popular as biological control agents to control these pests.

== Species ==
- Typhlodromus acacia Xin, Liang & Ke, 1980
- Typhlodromus acaciae Schultz, 1973
- Typhlodromus accessorius Kolodochka, 1993
- Typhlodromus adenensis Ueckermann, 1996
- Typhlodromus admirabilis (Wainstein, 1978)
- Typhlodromus aenaulus Ueckermann, 1996
- Typhlodromus aestivalis Athias-Henriot, 1960
- Typhlodromus agilis (Chaudhri, 1975)
- Typhlodromus ailanthi Wang & Xu, 1985
- Typhlodromus aktherecus (Kolodochka, 1979)
- Typhlodromus algonquinensis Chant, Hansell & Yoshida-Shaul, 1974
- Typhlodromus americanus Chant & Yoshida-Shaul, 1989
- Typhlodromus andrei Karg, 1982
- Typhlodromus apoxys van der Merwe, 1968
- Typhlodromus applegum Schicha, 1983
- Typhlodromus argyronamus Ueckermann & Loots, 1988
- Typhlodromus arizonicus (Tuttle & Muma, 1973)
- Typhlodromus armiger Ehara & Amano, 1998
- Typhlodromus arunachalensis Gupta, 1986
- Typhlodromus astibus Ueckermann & Loots, 1984
- Typhlodromus asticus El-Banhawy & Abou-Awad, 1991
- Typhlodromus athenas Swirski & Ragusa, 1976
- Typhlodromus athiasae Porath & Swirski, 1965
- Typhlodromus atticus Swirski & Ragusa, 1976
- Typhlodromus auratus Ueckermann & Loots, 1988
- Typhlodromus baccettii Lombardini, 1960
- Typhlodromus bagdasarjani Wainstein & Arutunjan, 1967
- Typhlodromus bakeri (Garman, 1948)
- Typhlodromus balakotiensis (Chaudhri, Akbar & Rasool, 1974)
- Typhlodromus balanites El-Badry, 1967
- Typhlodromus bambusae Ehara, 1964
- Typhlodromus bambusicolus Gupta, 1977
- Typhlodromus banahawensis Schicha & Corpuz-Raros, 1992
- Typhlodromus beglarovi Kuznetsov, 1984
- Typhlodromus bergi Moraes & McMurtry, 1988
- Typhlodromus beskaravainyi (Kuznetsov, 1984)
- Typhlodromus betulae (Kolodochka, 1992)
- Typhlodromus bichaetae Karg, 1989
- Typhlodromus bifurcuta Wu, 1983
- Typhlodromus bondarenkoi (Arutunjan, 1973)
- Typhlodromus borealis Ehara, 1967
- Typhlodromus brevimedius Wu & Liu, 1991
- Typhlodromus brisbanensis Schicha, 1978
- Typhlodromus buccalis van der Merwe, 1968
- Typhlodromus bullatus van der Merwe, 1968
- Typhlodromus cannabis Ke & Xin, 1983
- Typhlodromus capparidis van der Merwe, 1968
- Typhlodromus caucasicus (Abbasova, 1970)
- Typhlodromus caudiglans Schuster, 1959
- Typhlodromus celastrus Ueckermann & Loots, 1988
- Typhlodromus cephalochaitosus Moraes, Oliveira & Zannou, 2001
- Typhlodromus cerasicolus (Wainstein & Vartapetov, 1972)
- Typhlodromus cervix Wu & Li, 1984
- Typhlodromus changi Tseng, 1975
- Typhlodromus channabasavannai Gupta, 1978
- Typhlodromus chanti Hirschmann, 1962
- Typhlodromus charactus Ueckermann, 1996
- Typhlodromus chazeaui Blommers, 1973
- Typhlodromus chinensis Ehara & Lee, 1971
- Typhlodromus chrysanthemi Gupta, 1977
- Typhlodromus clairathiasae Wainstein & Arutunjan, 1967
- Typhlodromus combretum McMurtry & Moraes, 1991
- Typhlodromus commenticius Livshitz & Kuznetsov, 1972
- Typhlodromus communis Gupta, 1980
- Typhlodromus concavus Wang & Xu, 1991
- Typhlodromus confusus Narayanan, Kaur & Ghai, 1960
- Typhlodromus coniferculus (Wainstein, 1978)
- Typhlodromus corticis Herbert, 1958
- Typhlodromus coryli Wu & Lan, 1991
- Typhlodromus coryphus Wu, 1985
- Typhlodromus cotoneastri Wainstein, 1961
- Typhlodromus crassus van der Merwe, 1968
- Typhlodromus creticus Stathakis & Papadoulis, 2012
- Typhlodromus cuii Wu & Ou, 1998
- Typhlodromus dactylifera (Chaudhri, Akbar & Rasool, 1974)
- Typhlodromus dalfardicus (Daneshvar, 1987)
- Typhlodromus dalii (Rather, 1984)
- Typhlodromus daresalaami El-Banhawy & Abou-Awad, 1991
- Typhlodromus darjeelingensis Gupta, 1986
- Typhlodromus dasiphorae Wu & Lan, 1991
- Typhlodromus datongensis Wang & Xu, 1991
- Typhlodromus deleoni (Denmark & Muma, 1975)
- Typhlodromus denarus Schicha & Corpuz-Raros, 1992
- Typhlodromus denmarki (Rather, 1984)
- Typhlodromus diumbokus Schicha & Corpuz-Raros, 1992
- Typhlodromus divergentis (Chaudhri, Akbar & Rasool, 1974)
- Typhlodromus doreenae Schicha, 1987
- Typhlodromus dossei Schicha, 1978
- Typhlodromus drori Grinberg & Amitai, 1970
- Typhlodromus drymis Ueckermann & Loots, 1988
- Typhlodromus eddiei Ueckermann & Loots, 1988
- Typhlodromus egypticus El-Badry, 1967
- Typhlodromus elisae Schicha & McMurtry, 1986
- Typhlodromus elmassri Bayan, 1988
- Typhlodromus eremicus Ueckermann, in Meyer & Ueckermann 1989
- Typhlodromus eremitidis (Chaudhri, Akbar & Rassol, 1974)
- Typhlodromus ernesti Ragusa & Swirski, 1978
- Typhlodromus evectus (Schuster, 1966)
- Typhlodromus februs van der Merwe, 1968
- Typhlodromus fleschneri Chant, 1960
- Typhlodromus foenilis Oudemans, 1930
- Typhlodromus foraminosus (Schuster, 1966)
- Typhlodromus fujianensis Wu & Liu, 1991
- Typhlodromus galummatus (Chaudhri, Akbar & Rassol, 1974)
- Typhlodromus gardeniae Schultz, 1973
- Typhlodromus garhwalicus Gupta, 1982
- Typhlodromus georgicus Wainstein, 1958
- Typhlodromus ghanii (Muma, 1967)
- Typhlodromus gopali Gupta, 1969
- Typhlodromus gouaniae Schicha, 1983
- Typhlodromus gracilentus Tseng, 1975
- Typhlodromus grastis Ueckermann & Loots, 1988
- Typhlodromus gressitti McMurtry & Moraes, 1985
- Typhlodromus griekwensis Schultz, 1973
- Typhlodromus guangdongensis Wu & Lan, 1994
- Typhlodromus guangxiensis Wu, Lan & Zeng, 1997
- Typhlodromus gulingensis Zhu, 1985
- Typhlodromus gutierrezi Blommers, 1973
- Typhlodromus hadii Chaudhri, 1965
- Typhlodromus hadzhievi (Abbasova, 1970)
- Typhlodromus haiastanius (Arutunjan, 1977)
- Typhlodromus halinae (Wainstein & Kolodochka, 1974)
- Typhlodromus haramotoi Prasad, 1968
- Typhlodromus hartlandrowei Evans, 1958
- Typhlodromus hebetis (De Leon, 1959)
- Typhlodromus hibernus Wang & Xu, 1991
- Typhlodromus higoensis Ehara, 1985
- Typhlodromus himalayensis Gupta, 1981
- Typhlodromus hirashimai Ehara, 1972
- Typhlodromus homalii Gupta, 1970
- Typhlodromus hui Wu, 1987
- Typhlodromus hungaricus Bozai, 1997
- Typhlodromus ilicis Athias-Henriot, 1960
- Typhlodromus incasus (Chaudhri, 1975)
- Typhlodromus incertus Athias-Henriot, 1960
- Typhlodromus incisivus van der Merwe, 1968
- Typhlodromus inhabilis Kuznetsov, 1984
- Typhlodromus inopinatus (Wainstein, 1975)
- Typhlodromus inops (De Leon, 1967)
- Typhlodromus insularis Ehara, 1966
- Typhlodromus intercalaris Livshitz & Kuznetsov, 1972
- Typhlodromus intermedius Wu, 1988
- Typhlodromus invectus Chant, 1959
- Typhlodromus involutus Livshitz & Kuznetsov, 1972
- Typhlodromus iranensis (Denmark & Daneshvar, 1982)
- Typhlodromus johannae Ueckermann & Loots, 1988
- Typhlodromus jordanis (Rivnay & Swirski, 1980)
- Typhlodromus kadii Kandeel & El-Halawany, 1985
- Typhlodromus kadonoi Ehara, in Ehara, Okada & Kato 1994
- Typhlodromus kashmiricus Gupta, 1981
- Typhlodromus kazachstanicus Wainstein, 1958
- Typhlodromus kazimiae (Denmark & Muma, 1978)
- Typhlodromus kerkirae Swirski & Ragusa, 1976
- Typhlodromus khosrovensis Arutunjan, 1971
- Typhlodromus kiso Ehara, 1972
- Typhlodromus klimenkoi Kolodochka, 1980
- Typhlodromus knisleyi Denmark, 1992
- Typhlodromus kodaikanalensis Gupta, 1978
- Typhlodromus kolodochkai (Denmark & Welbourn, 2002)
- Typhlodromus krimbasi Papadoulis & Emmanouel, 1997
- Typhlodromus kutabus Schicha & Corpuz-Raros, 1992
- Typhlodromus kuznetsovi (Denmark & Welbourn, 2002)
- Typhlodromus kykladiticus Papadoulis & Emmanouel, 1993
- Typhlodromus lalazariensis (Chaudhri, 1975)
- Typhlodromus lanyuensis Tseng, 1975
- Typhlodromus lataniae El-Badry, 1968
- Typhlodromus lateris Wu, Lan & Liu, 1995
- Typhlodromus laurae Arutunjan, 1974
- Typhlodromus leptodactylus Wainstein, 1961
- Typhlodromus libitus (Chaudhri, 1975)
- Typhlodromus limitatus (Chaudhri, Akbar & Rasool, 1979)
- Typhlodromus linzhiensis Wu, 1987
- Typhlodromus longa (Denmark & Knisley, 1978)
- Typhlodromus longicervix Wu & Liu, 1997
- Typhlodromus longipalpus Swirski & Ragusa, 1976
- Typhlodromus lootsi Schultz, 1972
- Typhlodromus loralaiana (Muma, 1967)
- Typhlodromus lushanensis Zhu, 1985
- Typhlodromus luzonensis Schicha & Corpuz-Raros, 1992
- Typhlodromus machaon (Wainstein, 1977)
- Typhlodromus macroides Zhu, 1985
- Typhlodromus macrum Ke & Xin, 1983
- Typhlodromus magdalenae Pritchard & Baker, 1962
- Typhlodromus majumderi Gupta, 1986
- Typhlodromus malicolus Wainstein & Arutunjan, 1967
- Typhlodromus mangiferus Zaher & El-Brollosy, in Zaher 1986
- Typhlodromus manipurensis Gupta, 1977
- Typhlodromus maracus (Chaudhri, 1975)
- Typhlodromus marinus Wu & Liu, 1991
- Typhlodromus maspalomensis Ferragut & Pena-Estevez, 2003
- Typhlodromus matthyssei Ueckermann & Loots, 1988
- Typhlodromus meerutensis (Ghai & Menon, 1969)
- Typhlodromus meritus (Wainstein, 1978)
- Typhlodromus mesasiaticus Wainstein, 1962
- Typhlodromus michaeli Ueckermann & Loots, 1988
- Typhlodromus microbullatus van der Merwe, 1968
- Typhlodromus miyarai Ehara, 1967
- Typhlodromus monosetus Wang & Xu, 1991
- Typhlodromus montanus Chant & Yoshida-Shaul, 1978
- Typhlodromus morellensis Ferragut, 1991
- Typhlodromus mori Gupta, 1981
- Typhlodromus moroccoensis Denmark, 1992
- Typhlodromus muliebris van der Merwe, 1968
- Typhlodromus namaquaensis Ueckermann & Loots, 1988
- Typhlodromus ndibu Pritchard & Baker, 1962
- Typhlodromus neobakeri Prasad, 1968
- Typhlodromus neocrassus Tseng, 1983
- Typhlodromus neorhenanus Gupta, 1977
- Typhlodromus neotransvaalensis Gupta, 1978
- Typhlodromus neyshabouris (Denmark & Daneshvar, 1982)
- Typhlodromus nilgiriensis Gupta, 1986
- Typhlodromus nobilis (Kuznetsov, 1984)
- Typhlodromus norvegicus Edland & Evans, 1998
- Typhlodromus oasis El-Badry, 1968
- Typhlodromus obesus Tseng, 1983
- Typhlodromus occiduus (Karg, 1990)
- Typhlodromus octavus (Chaudhri, Akbar & Rassol, 1974)
- Typhlodromus olympicus Papadoulis & Emmanouel, 1993
- Typhlodromus ordinatur (Kuznetsov, 1984)
- Typhlodromus orientalis Wu, 1981
- Typhlodromus orissaensis Gupta, 1977
- Typhlodromus ornata (Denmark & Muma, 1973)
- Typhlodromus ornatulus (Chaudhri, 1975)
- Typhlodromus paganus van der Merwe, 1968
- Typhlodromus paraevectus Moraes & McMurtry, 1983
- Typhlodromus parinopinatus (Evans & Edland, 1998)
- Typhlodromus pegazzani Ragusa & Swirski, 1978
- Typhlodromus pentelicus Papadoulis & Emmanouel, 1990
- Typhlodromus persianus McMurtry, 1977
- Typhlodromus persicus Gupta, 1992
- Typhlodromus personatus Karg, 1989
- Typhlodromus phialatus Athias-Henriot, 1960
- Typhlodromus philippinensis Corpuz-Raros, 1966
- Typhlodromus phylaktioticus Papadoulis & Emmanouel, 1990
- Typhlodromus pineus Wu & Li, 1984
- Typhlodromus pirianykae (Wainstein, 1972)
- Typhlodromus platycladus Xin, Liang & Ke, 1980
- Typhlodromus ponticus (Kolodochka, 1992)
- Typhlodromus porathi Swirski & Amitai, 1967
- Typhlodromus porus Wu, 1988
- Typhlodromus povtari (Kolodochka, 1988)
- Typhlodromus praeacutus van der Merwe, 1968
- Typhlodromus pruni Gupta, 1970
- Typhlodromus pseudopyri Ehara & Amano, 1998
- Typhlodromus pseudoserrulatus Tseng, 1983
- Typhlodromus psyllakisi Swirski & Ragusa, 1976
- Typhlodromus pyri Scheuten, 1857
- Typhlodromus qianshanensis Wu, 1988
- Typhlodromus quadratoides Wu & Liu, 1997
- Typhlodromus quadratus Wu & Liu, 1997
- Typhlodromus quercicolus Denmark, 1992
- Typhlodromus rapidus Wainstein & Arutunjan, 1968
- Typhlodromus rarus Wainstein, 1961
- Typhlodromus rasilis van der Merwe, 1968
- Typhlodromus recki Wainstein, 1958
- Typhlodromus religiosus Ueckermann & Loots, 1988
- Typhlodromus repens (Beglyarov, 1981)
- Typhlodromus rhenanoides Athias-Henriot, 1960
- Typhlodromus rhenanus (Oudemans, 1905)
- Typhlodromus rhododendroni Gupta, 1978
- Typhlodromus ribei Ke & Xin, 1983
- Typhlodromus richteri Karg, 1970
- Typhlodromus rickeri Chant, 1960
- Typhlodromus rivulus (Karg, 1991)
- Typhlodromus rodovae Wainstein & Arutunjan, 1968
- Typhlodromus rodriguezi (Denmark & Daneshvar, 1982)
- Typhlodromus roshanlali Narayanan & Ghai, 1963
- Typhlodromus rubetum (Wainstein, 1972)
- Typhlodromus ryukyuensis Ehara, 1967
- Typhlodromus sabelisi Ferla, N.J.; Silva, G.L. da; Nascimento, J.M. do 2012
- Typhlodromus saevus van der Merwe, 1968
- Typhlodromus salviae (Kolodochka, 1979)
- Typhlodromus samliensis (Chaudhri, 1975)
- Typhlodromus sapiens Athias-Henriot, 1960
- Typhlodromus sapphicus Ragusa & Tsolakis, 1998
- Typhlodromus serratosus El-Halawany & Abdel-Samad, 1990
- Typhlodromus serratus (Chaudhri, 1975)
- Typhlodromus serrulatus Ehara, 1972
- Typhlodromus setubali Dosse, 1961
- Typhlodromus shibai Ehara, 1981
- Typhlodromus sica (Chaudhri, Akbar & Rassol, 1974)
- Typhlodromus sijiensis Gupta, 1986
- Typhlodromus silvanus Ehara & Kishimoto, in Ehara, Okada & Kato 1994
- Typhlodromus singularis Chant, 1957
- Typhlodromus sonprayagensis Gupta, 1985
- Typhlodromus spectatus (Kolodochka, 1992)
- Typhlodromus spiceae (Vermaak, 2021)
- Typhlodromus spiralis (Wainstein & Kolodochka, 1974)
- Typhlodromus subarcticus Chant, Hansell & Yoshida-Shaul, 1974
- Typhlodromus subequalis Wu, 1988
- Typhlodromus submarinus Wu, Lan & Zeng, 1997
- Typhlodromus sudanicus El-Badry, 1967
- Typhlodromus suecicus (Sellnick, 1958)
- Typhlodromus swirskii Denmark, 1992
- Typhlodromus sycomorus Zaher & Shehata, 1969
- Typhlodromus taishanensis Wang & Xu, 1985
- Typhlodromus tamaricis (Kolodochka, 1982)
- Typhlodromus tardus (Kuznetsov, 1984)
- Typhlodromus tecoma (Denmark & Evans, 1999)
- Typhlodromus tenuis (Kuznetsov, 1984)
- Typhlodromus ternatus Ehara, 1972
- Typhlodromus terrulentis van der Merwe, 1968
- Typhlodromus thailandicus Ehara & Bhandhufalck, 1977
- Typhlodromus theroni Ueckermann & Loots, 1988
- Typhlodromus thesbites (Swirski & Amitai, 1997)
- Typhlodromus tiliae Oudemans, 1929
- Typhlodromus torbatejamae (Denmark & Daneshvar, 1982)
- Typhlodromus totifolianensis El-Banhawy & Abou-Awad, 1991
- Typhlodromus transvaalensis (Nesbitt, 1951)
- Typhlodromus tridentiger Tseng, 1975
- Typhlodromus tubifer Wainstein, 1961
- Typhlodromus tulinae Döker, 2023
- Typhlodromus ulmi Wang & Xu, 1985
- Typhlodromus umbraculus Ueckermann & Loots, 1988
- Typhlodromus umbratus (Chaudhri, Akbar & Rassol, 1974)
- Typhlodromus verbenae Wu & Lan, 1994
- Typhlodromus vescus van der Merwe, 1968
- Typhlodromus viniferae (Rather, 1987)
- Typhlodromus votivus (Meshkov, 1990)
- Typhlodromus vulgaris Ehara, 1959
- Typhlodromus wainsteini (Abbasova, 1970)
- Typhlodromus werneri Schultz, 1973
- Typhlodromus wichmanni Hirschmann, 1962
- Typhlodromus wonkooi Ryu & Ehara, 1992
- Typhlodromus wrenschae Ueckermann & Loots, 1988
- Typhlodromus xingchengensis Wu, Lan & Zhang, 1992
- Typhlodromus xini Wu, 1983
- Typhlodromus xinjiangensis Wu & Li, 1987
- Typhlodromus xiufui Wu & Liu, 1997
- Typhlodromus xizangensis Wu & Lan, 1994
- Typhlodromus yamashitai Ehara, 1972
- Typhlodromus yasumatsui Ehara, 1966
- Typhlodromus yinchuanensis Liang & Hu, 1988
- Typhlodromus yphlodromus (kikuyuensis Swirski & Ragusa, 1978)
- Typhlodromus zafari Chaudhri, 1965
- Typhlodromus zaheri Denmark, 1992
- Typhlodromus zhangyensis Wang & Xu, 1991
- Typhlodromus zhaoi Wu & Li, 1983
