= James A. McMurtry =

American entomologist and acarologist

- Born: James Allen McMurtry; 21 September 1932; California, United States
- Died: 28 July 2017 (aged 84)
- Education: San Jose State University; University of California, Davis
- Known for: Research on predatory mites and biological control of mite pests
- Scientific career
- Fields: Acarology, Entomology, Biological control
- Workplaces: University of California, Riverside

James Allen McMurtry (21 September 1932 – 28 July 2017) was an American entomologist and acarologist known for his pioneering work on predatory mites and the biological control of phytophagous mites. He was a professor emeritus at the University of California, Riverside and is regarded as one of the leading specialists on the mite family Phytoseiidae.

== Early life and education ==
McMurtry was born in California in 1932 and grew up in farming communities in central California. He developed an interest in insects and natural history during childhood. He completed his undergraduate studies in biological sciences at San Jose State University before serving in the United States Army from 1954 to 1956.

After military service, he joined the University of California, Davis, where he earned a PhD in 1960 studying host plant resistance in alfalfa aphids.

== Career ==
Following his doctorate, McMurtry joined the faculty of the Division of Biological Control at the University of California, Riverside. His research focused primarily on the ecology, taxonomy and use of predatory mites for the biological control of agricultural pests.

He published around 80 scientific papers on phytoseiid mites and collaborated with researchers from numerous countries. Along with collaborators, he described dozens of new species and genera of predatory mites.

McMurtry contributed significantly to biological control programs involving species such as Phytoseiulus persimilis and Euseius stipulatus. His studies on augmentative releases of predatory mites became influential in integrated pest management systems.

== Recognition ==
McMurtry received the Distinguished Scientist Award from the Nearctic Regional Section of the International Organization for Biological Control in 2001.

In 2018, the Systematic & Applied Acarology Society established the James Allen McMurtry Award in his memory to recognize outstanding contributions to acarology.
