= Gilberto José de Moraes =

Brazilian acarologist and entomologist

- Education: University of California, Riverside
- Known for: Research on predatory mites, taxonomy and biological control
- Scientific career
- Fields: Acarology, Entomology, Biological control
- Workplaces: University of São Paulo

Gilberto José de Moraes is a Brazilian acarologist and entomologist known for his contributions to the taxonomy, ecology and biological control of mites, particularly predatory mites in the family Phytoseiidae. He has been associated with the Department of Entomology and Acarology at the University of São Paulo's Escola Superior de Agricultura Luiz de Queiroz (ESALQ).

== Education and career ==
Moraes graduated in agronomic engineering from ESALQ in 1975. He later worked at the Empresa Brasileira de Pesquisa Agropecuária (EMBRAPA). He obtained both his master's degree and doctorate in entomology from the University of California, Riverside, completing his doctorate in 1985.

After returning to Brazil, he continued research on agricultural acarology, biodiversity and biological control. He later joined ESALQ/USP, where he became one of the leading figures in Brazilian acarology.

== Research ==
Moraes has conducted extensive research on predatory mites and their use in controlling agricultural pests. His work includes taxonomy, systematics, biodiversity surveys and integrated pest management.

He has authored and co-authored numerous scientific publications and participated in international acarological congresses and symposia.

Moraes has also contributed to studies on the future directions of acarology in Brazil and has emphasized the importance of mite biodiversity and biological control in agriculture.

== Recognition ==
Moraes has been recognized as one of the prominent acarologists in Brazil and internationally. In 2024, he was honored during the VIII Simpósio Brasileiro de Acarologia for his longstanding contributions to acarology.
