= Typhlodromus vulgaris =

Scientific classification
- Domain: Eukaryota
- Kingdom: Animalia
- Phylum: Arthropoda
- Subphylum: Chelicerata
- Class: Arachnida
- Order: Mesostigmata
- Family: Phytoseiidae
- Genus: Typhlodromus
- Species: T. vulgaris

Binomial name
- Typhlodromus vulgaris Ehara, 1959

Synonyms
- Typhlodromus juniperus Chant, 1959

Species of mite

Typhlodromus vulgaris is a species of predatory mite belonging to the family Phytoseiidae. This is a very small species, the female only reaching a length of 360 μm and the male even smaller at 260 μm. The body is oval, white or grey, sometimes with a pinkish tinge. It can be distinguished from its congeners by the large number (10 pairs) of setae on the lateral part of the dorsal surface and by the distinctive spatulate setae on the fourth pair of legs. In addition the female has a very unusually shaped sclerotized ventrianal shield, longer than wide with a convex anterior margin and deeply concave lateral margins.

This species is found on various fruit trees throughout Japan. It can be used in biological pest control against spider mites.
