= Typhlodrominae =

Scientific classification
- Kingdom: Animalia
- Phylum: Arthropoda
- Subphylum: Chelicerata
- Class: Arachnida
- Order: Mesostigmata
- Family: Phytoseiidae
- Subfamily: Typhlodrominae; Scheuten, 1857

Subfamily of mites

Typhlodrominae is a subfamily of predatory mites in the Phytoseiidae family.

== Genera ==
- Africoseiulus Chant & McMurtry, 1994
- Australiseiulus Muma, 1961
- Chanteius Wainstein, 1962
- Cocoseius Denmark & Andrews, 1981
- Cydnoseius Muma, 1967
- Galendromimus Muma, 1961
- Galendromus Muma, 1961
- Gigagnathus Chant, 1965
- Kuzinellus Wainstein, 1976
- Leonseius Chant & McMurtry, 1994
- Metaseiulus Muma, 1961
- Meyerius van der Merwe, 1968
- Neoseiulella Muma, 1961
- Papuaseius Chant & McMurtry, 1994
- Paraseiulus Muma, 1961
- Silvaseius Chant & McMurtry, 1994
- Typhlodromina Muma, 1961
- Typhlodromus Scheuten, 1857
- Typhloseiopsis De Leon, 1959
- Typhloseiulus Chant & McMurtry, 1994
