= Metaseiulus =

Scientific classification
- Kingdom: Animalia
- Phylum: Arthropoda
- Subphylum: Chelicerata
- Class: Arachnida
- Order: Mesostigmata
- Family: Phytoseiidae
- Subfamily: Typhlodrominae
- Genus: Metaseiulus; Muma, 1961

Genus of mites

Metaseiulus is a genus of mites in the Phytoseiidae family.

== Species ==
- Metaseiulus denmarki (Chant & Yoshida-Shaul, 1984)
- Metaseiulus luculentis (De Leon, 1959)
- Metaseiulus serratus (Tuttle & Muma, 1973)
- Metaseiulus adjacentis (De Leon, 1959)
- Metaseiulus arboreus (Chant, 1957)
- Metaseiulus anchialus (Kennett, 1958)
- Metaseiulus arceuthobius (Kennett, 1963)
- Metaseiulus bidentatus (Denmark & Evans, in Denmark, Evans, Aguilar, Vargas & Ochoa 1999)
- Metaseiulus bisoni (Chant & Yoshida-Shaul, 1984)
- Metaseiulus brevicollis Gonzalez & Schuster, 1962
- Metaseiulus bromus (Denmark, 1982)
- Metaseiulus camelliae (Chant & Yoshida-Shaul, 1983)
- Metaseiulus citri (Garman & McGregor, 1956)
- Metaseiulus cornus (De Leon, 1957)
- Metaseiulus deleoni (Hirschmann, 1962)
- Metaseiulus edwardi (Chant & Yoshida-Shaul, 1983)
- Metaseiulus eiko (El-Banhawy, 1984)
- Metaseiulus ellipticus (De Leon, 1958)
- Metaseiulus flumenis (Chant, 1957)
- Metaseiulus gramina (Tuttle & Muma, 1973)
- Metaseiulus greeneae (Denmark & Muma, 1967)
- Metaseiulus herbertae (Nesbitt, 1951)
- Metaseiulus johnsoni (Mahr, 1979)
- Metaseiulus juniperoides (De Leon, 1962)
- Metaseiulus lindquisti (Chant & Yoshida-Shaul, 1984)
- Metaseiulus mahri (Chant & Yoshida-Shaul, 1984)
- Metaseiulus mexicanus (Muma, 1963)
- Metaseiulus negundinis (Denmark, 1982)
- Metaseiulus nelsoni (Chant, 1959)
- Metaseiulus neoflumenis Moraes & Kreiter, in Moraes, Kreiter & Lofego 2000
- Metaseiulus paraflumenis (Chant & Yoshida-Shaul, 1984)
- Metaseiulus pedoni (Zaher & Shehata, 1969)
- Metaseiulus pini (Chant, 1955)
- Metaseiulus plumipilis (Denmark, 1994)
- Metaseiulus pomi (Parrott, 1906)
- Metaseiulus pomoides Schuster & Pritchard, 1963
- Metaseiulus profitai (Denmark, 1994)
- Metaseiulus smithi (Schuster, 1957)
- Metaseiulus tuttlei (Denmark, 1982)
- Metaseiulus valentii (Denmark, 1994)
- Metaseiulus validus (Chant, 1957)
