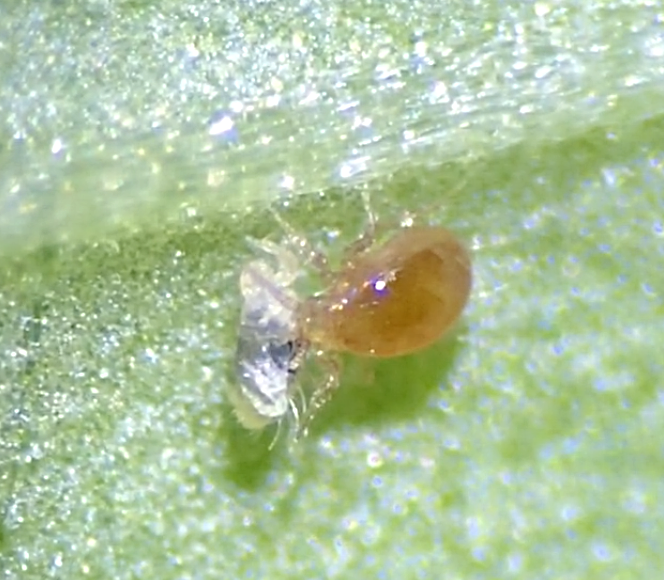
- Proprioseiopsis mexicanus

Scientific classification
- Kingdom: Animalia
- Phylum: Arthropoda
- Subphylum: Chelicerata
- Class: Arachnida
- Order: Mesostigmata
- Suborder: Monogynaspida
- Infraorder: Gamasina
- Superfamily: Phytoseioidea
- Family: Phytoseiidae; Berlese, 1916

Subfamilies
- Amblyseiinae Muma, 1961; Phytoseiinae Berlese, 1916; Typhlodrominae Scheuten, 1857

Diversity
- About 90 genera, over 2,000 species

= Phytoseiidae =

Family of mites

The Phytoseiidae are a family of predatory mites which feed on thrips and other mite species. They are often used as a biological control agent for managing mite pests. Because of their usefulness as biological control agents, interest in Phytoseiidae has steadily increased over the past century. Public awareness of the biological control potential of invertebrates has been growing, though mainly in the US and Europe. In 1950, there were 34 known species. Today, there are 2,731 documented species organized in 90 genera and three subfamilies.

A predatory mite investigates a milkweed aphid on narrow-leaf milkweed. Two short segments repeated at one fourth speed.

== Subfamilies ==
The family Phytoseiidae contains these subfamilies:

- Amblyseiinae Muma, 1961
- Phytoseiinae Berlese, 1916
- Typhlodrominae Scheuten, 1857

== Anatomy and life cycle ==
Phytoseiid eggs can be found along the vein of the bottom side of a leaf. They are oblong and translucent white.

The larvae of these mites range from translucent white to tan in colour. They are tiny and oval in shape and size, have six legs, and are wingless. Nymphs look similar to larvae, with the exception of being slightly larger and having eight legs.

Adult phytoseiids are less than 0.5 mm in size, pear-shaped, wingless, and have eight legs. They are translucent white, but turn a pale tan, orange/red, or green after feeding.

Developmental rate is species-specific, ranging from less than a week to four weeks, with temperature and diet affecting the rate.

The body of Phytoseiidae is divided into two parts: the gnathosoma (anterior) and idiosoma (posterior). The gnathosoma includes chelicerae, sensorial palps, and a stylophore. Males have an added feature- a spermatodactyl to transfer spermatophore to females.

== Lifestyles ==
Phytoseiid mites are best known as predators of small arthropods and nematodes, but many species are also known to feed on fungi, plant exudates, and pollen.

Scientists have proposed classifications of the Phytoseiidae based on their food sources. In the most current version, developed in 2013, phytoseiids are grouped into four types.

- Type I includes species that are specialized mite predators, with three subgroups determined by the type of prey.
- Type II includes species that feed on tetranychid mites, meaning mites that are capable of spinning webs.
- Type III phytoseiids are classified as generalist predators. They can feed on mites of many families, as well as thrips, whiteflies, nematodes, and even pollen. Type III is further subdivided into five groups based on the habitat where the phytoseiids can be found.
- Type IV phytoseiids rely on pollen as their primary food source. These species can also act as generalist predators, but they are most successful when feeding on pollen.

== Misconceptions ==
Mites are commonly associated as a whole with parasitic mites like scabies, chiggers, and bird mites, or common house dust mites, giving them a negative reputation. However, the family Phytoseiidae provides benefits for agriculture by feeding on pests. Insecticides are often used when handling agricultural pests, though to attract and conserve phytoseiid mites, broad-spectrum insecticides are to be avoided. Phytoseiidae can be used as biological control agents in place of toxic chemicals.

== Phytoseiidae as biological control agents ==
Phytoseiids are an important natural predator of the spider mite. When phytoseiid populations decline, spider mites can severely damage commercial crops. Since World War II, spider mite (tetranychid) populations have increased due to the use of synthetic pesticides. The reason pesticides have increased spider mite populations remains mysterious to scientists, but it has spurred an interest in phytoseiids as biological control agents. So far, research has shown that phytoseiids are effective control agents in both their native environments and open-field vegetable crops.

Phytoseiid species that act as biological control agents are influenced by the availability of their prey. Phytoseiids can postpone or delay egg production during periods when prey are scarce. This allows them to have a longer lifespan and likely serves as an adaptation to environments where prey availability is variable. In addition to being able to delay reproduction, phytoseiids are also capable of rapid reproduction when prey is readily available. They reproduce more when prey availability is high, which increases their effectiveness as biological control agents. When prey availability increases, females lay more eggs, and more healthy offspring are produced during reproductive periods. In addition, when prey availability increases, the Phytoseiidae kill more prey during reproductive cycles, and the ratio of prey killed to eggs laid increases.

== Wolbachia infections ==
Wolbachia, a parasitic bacterial genus that affects a vast array of arthropod species such as Drosophila simulans, is common in the Phytoseiidae. It affects gender determination and reproduction of its hosts, making it a powerful agent of evolution. Wolbachia species have been detected in many species of Phytoseiidae, both in the field and in the lab. Although most research focuses on Wolbachia in germ line tissues, the bacteria can also be found in somatic tissues. Wolbachia's main method of spreading is to be passed down through the generations in germline tissues, but it is also capable of being transferred horizontally.

Although Wolbachia bacteria do not benefit their hosts in any way, they are maintained in the population because infected mothers pass them to their offspring through the ovum. Over time, bacterial presence in a population can lead to complete reproductive isolation of that population from uninfected populations. Wolbachia causes speciation through reproductive isolation. Some hosts evolve with a dependency on Wolbachia for reproductive functions, so that individuals without Wolbachia infections have lower reproductive fitness.

Wolbachia influences the gender determination of its hosts, making females more common than males. In populations affected by Wolbachia, females commonly compete for the right to mate with males. This is one of the ways in which Wolbachia infections can lead to speciation, because females evolve traits that allow them to better compete for males. In extreme cases, the feminizing effect of Wolbachia can cause the host species to lose the chromosome responsible for female gender. Wolbachia infections are capable of causing the extinction of hosts by making females much more common than males.
