= Growing season =

Portion of the year in which local conditions permit normal plant growth

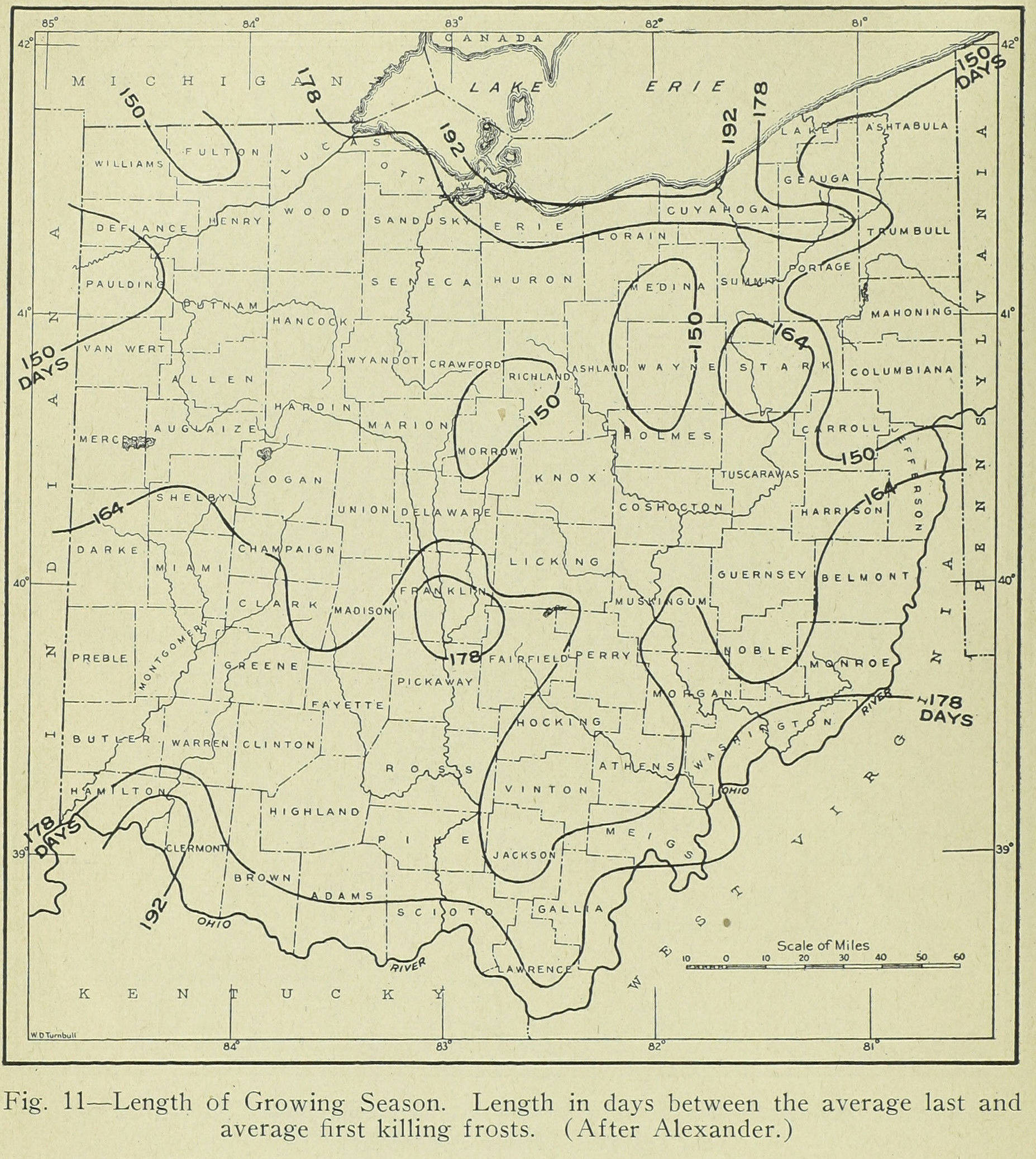
Map of average growing season length from "Geography of Ohio," 1923

A season is a division of the year marked by changes in weather, ecology, and the amount of daylight. The growing season is that portion of the year in which local conditions (i.e. rainfall, temperature, daylight) permit normal plant growth. While each plant or crop has a specific growing season that depends on its genetic adaptation, growing seasons can generally be grouped into macro-environmental classes.

Axial tilt of the Earth inherently affect growing seasons across the globe.

== Geography ==
Geographic conditions have major impacts on the growing season for any given area. Latitude is one of the major factors in the length of the growing season. The further from the equator one goes, the angle of the Sun gets lower in the sky. Consequently, sunlight is less direct and the low angle of the Sun means that soil takes longer to warm during the spring months, so the growing season begins later. The other factor is altitude, with high elevations having cooler temperatures which shortens the growing season compared with a low-lying area of the same latitude.

== Season extension ==
Season extension in agriculture is any method that allows a crop to be grown beyond its normal outdoor growing season and harvesting time frame, or the extra time thus achieved. To extend the growing season into the colder months, one can use unheated techniques such as floating row covers, low tunnels, caterpillar tunnels, or hoophouses. However, even if colder temperatures are mitigated, most crops will stop growing when the days become shorter than 10 hours, and resume after winter as the daylight increases above 10 hours. A hothouse — a greenhouse which is heated and illuminated — creates an environment where plants are fooled into thinking it is their normal growing season. Though this is a form of season extension for the grower, it is not the usual meaning of the term.

Season extension can apply to other climates, where conditions other than cold and shortened period of sunlight end the growing year (e.g. a rainy season).

== Locations ==
=== North America ===
Analyzing >250 US cities, all but two experienced fewer freezing days in 2025 than in 1956. As a result of global warming, on average, freezing days in 2025 began 11 days later and ended 26 days earlier, extending the growing season accordingly.

The continental United States ranges from 49° north at the US-Canadian border to 25° north at the southern tip of the US-Mexican border. Most populated areas of Canada are below the 55th parallel. North of the 45th parallel, the growing season is generally 4–5 months, beginning in late April or early May and continuing to late September-early October, and is characterized by warm summers and cold winters with heavy snow. South of the 30th parallel, the growing season is year-round in many areas with hot summers and mild winters. Cool season crops such as peas, lettuce, and spinach are planted in fall or late winter, while warm season crops such as beans and corn are planted in late winter to early spring. In the desert Southwest, the growing season effectively runs in winter, from October to April as the summer months are characterized by extreme heat and arid conditions, making it inhospitable for plants not adapted to this environment.

Certain crops such as tomatoes and melons originated in subtropical or tropical regions. Consequently, they require hot weather and a growing season of eight months or more. In colder climate areas where they cannot be directly sowed in the ground, these plants are usually started indoors in a greenhouse and transplanted outside in late spring or early summer.

=== Europe ===
The Pyrenees, Alps, and Southern Carpathians effectively divide Europe into two regions. Southern Europe and the Mediterranean are in general south of the 45th parallel. The growing seasons last six months or more, and the climate is characterized by hot summers and milder winters. Precipitation mainly falls between October and March, while summers are dry. In the extreme south of Europe, the growing season can be year-round. Vegetation on the Mediterranean islands is often evergreen because of the relatively warm winters.

Northern and Central Europe extend north from the 45th parallel past the Arctic Circle. The growing seasons are shorter because of the lower angle of the Sun and generally range from five months to as little as three in the highlands of Scandinavia and Russia. Climate on the Atlantic coast is considerably moderated by humid ocean air, which makes winters comparatively mild, and freezing weather or snow are rare. Because summers are also mild, many heat-loving plants such as maize do not typically grow in Northwestern Europe. Further inland, winters become considerably colder. Despite the short growing season in parts of Scandinavia and northern Russia, the extreme length of daylight during summer (17 hours or more) allows plants to put on significant growth.

=== Tropics and deserts ===
In some warm climates, such as the tropical savanna climates (Aw), the hot semi-arid climates (BSh), the hot desert climates (BWh) or the Mediterranean climates (Cs), the growing season is limited by the availability of water, with little growth in the dry season. Unlike in cooler climates where snow or soil freezing is a generally insurmountable obstacle to plant growth, it is often possible to greatly extend the growing season in hot climates by irrigation using water from cooler and/or wetter regions. This can in fact go so far as to allow year-round growth in areas that without irrigation could only support xerophytic plants.

In the tropical regions, the growing season can be interrupted by periods of heavy rainfall, called the rainy season. For example, in Colombia, where coffee is grown and can be harvested year-round, they do not see a rainy season. However, in Indonesia, another large coffee-producing area, they experience this rainy season and the growth of the coffee beans is interrupted.

== See also ==
- Frost
- Growing degree day
- Season
- Annual growth cycle of grapevines - growing season of grapevines
