= Landscape fabric =

Textile material used to control weeds

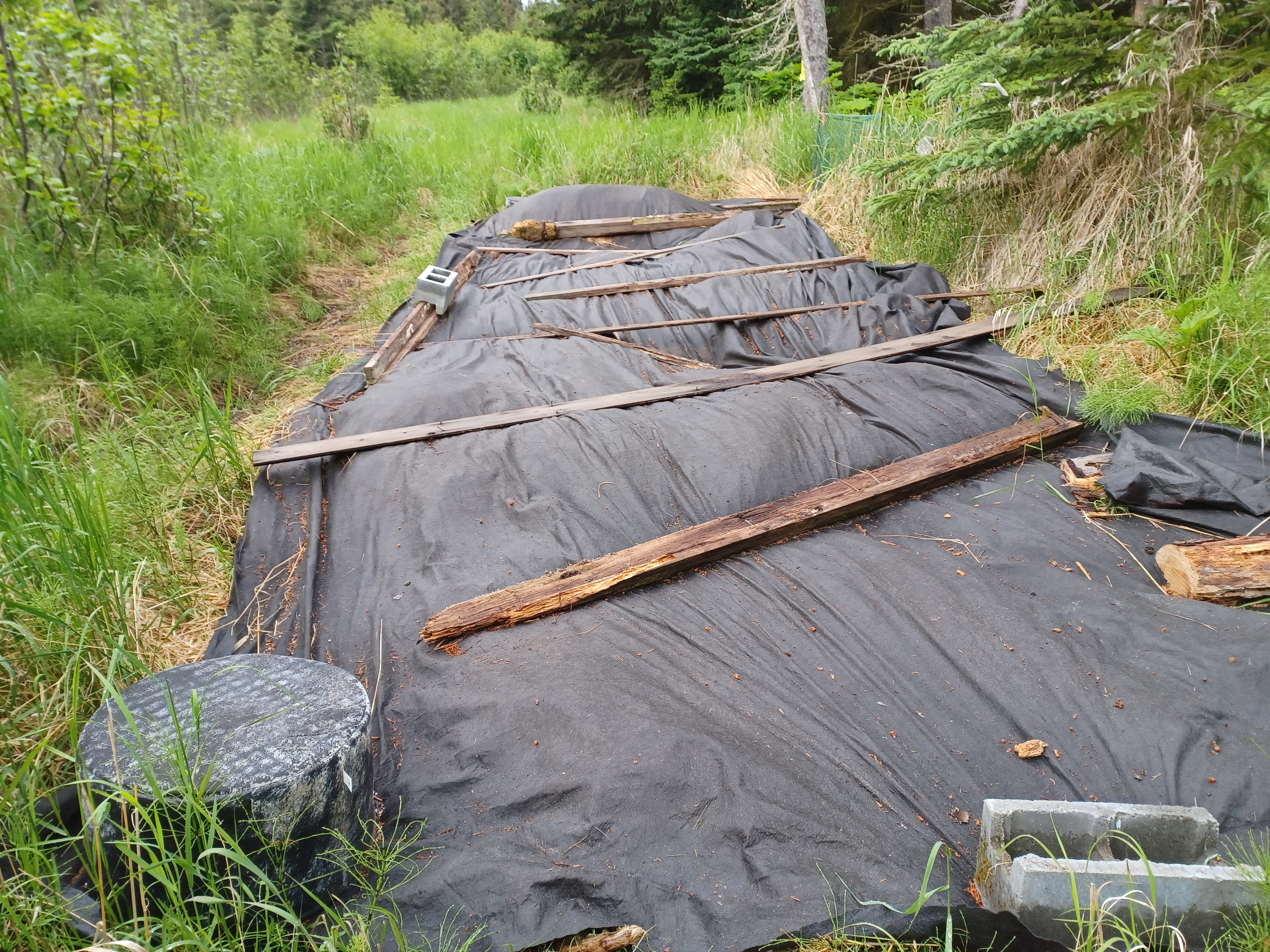
landscape fabric being used in a fairly crude manner to kill tall grasses.

Landscape fabric (a.k.a., weed barrier) is a textile material used to control weeds by inhibiting their exposure to sunlight. The fabric is normally placed around desirable plants, covering areas where other growth is unwanted. The fabric itself can be made from synthetic or organic materials, sometimes from recycled sources.

When placed under a thin layer of soil or mulch, landscape fabric is ineffective at blocking weeds because they can grow above or through the fabric. Once weeds grow through the fabric, they become extremely difficult to remove entirely. This fabric prevents nutrients from entering the soil from the surface.

Landscape fabric prevents rocks above it from sinking into the soil below which provides a stable surface for pathways or decorative features. Landscape fabric maintains moisture necessary for plant growth in the soil below.

== See also ==
- Horticultural fleece
