= Vegetable =

Edible plant part consumed as food

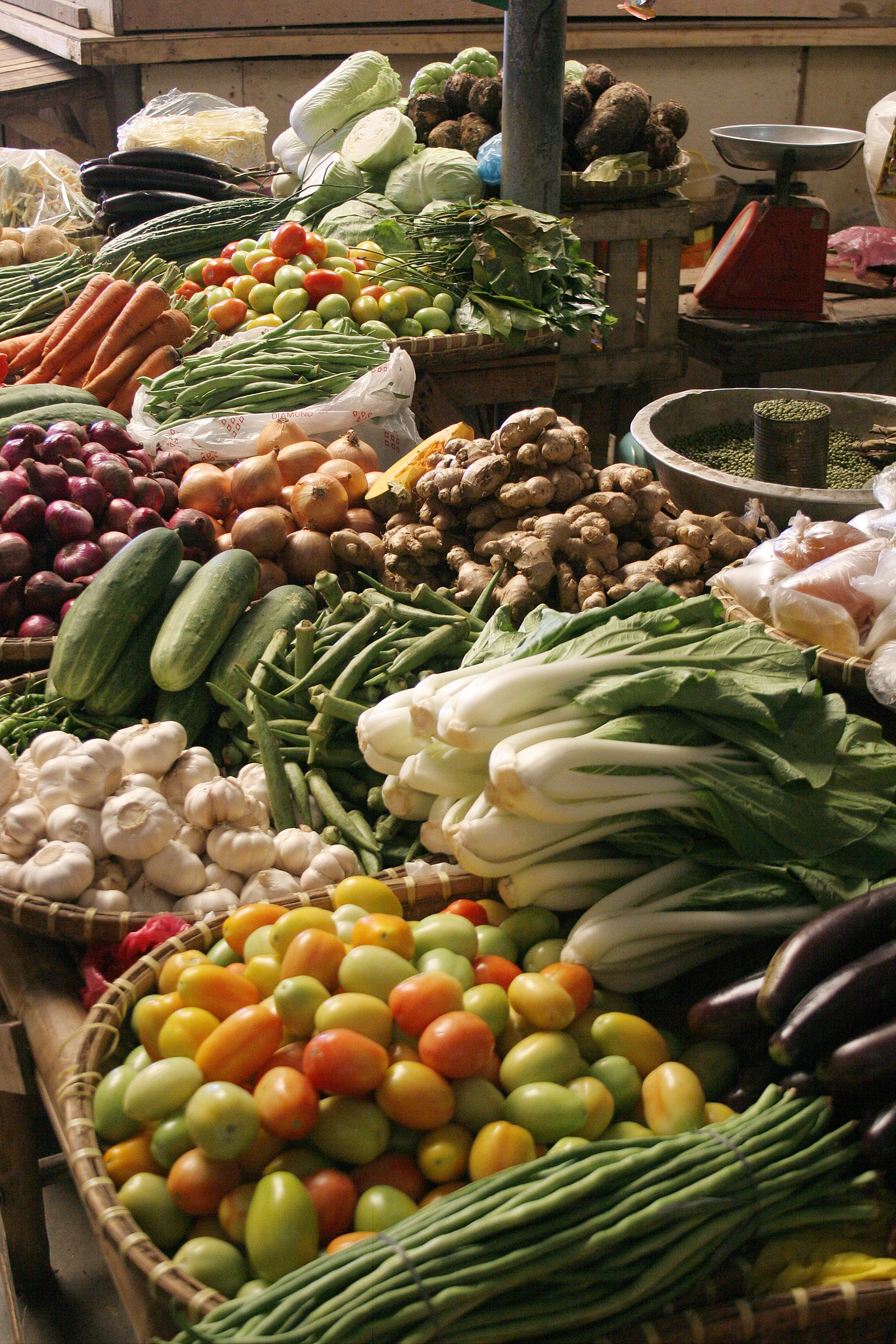
Vegetables separated with baskets in a market in the Philippines

Vegetables are edible parts of plants that are consumed by humans or other animals as food. This original meaning is still commonly used, and is applied to plants collectively to refer to all edible plant matter, including flowers, fruits, stems, leaves, roots, and seeds. An alternative definition is applied somewhat arbitrarily, often by culinary and cultural tradition; it may include savoury fruits such as tomatoes and squash, flowers such as broccoli, and seeds such as pulses, but exclude foods derived from some plants that are fruits, flowers, nuts, and cereal grains.

Originally, vegetables were collected from the wild by hunter-gatherers and entered cultivation in several parts of the world, probably during the period 10,000 BC to 7,000 BC, when a new agricultural way of life developed. At first, plants that grew locally were cultivated, but as time went on, trade brought common and exotic crops from elsewhere to add to domestic types. Nowadays, most vegetables are grown all over the world as climate permits, and crops may be cultivated in protected environments in less suitable locations. China is the largest producer of vegetables, and global trade in agricultural products allows consumers to purchase vegetables grown in faraway countries. The scale of production varies from subsistence farmers supplying the needs of their family for food, to agribusinesses with vast acreages of single-product crops. Depending on the type of vegetable concerned, harvesting the crop is followed by grading, storing, processing, and marketing.

Vegetables can be eaten either raw or cooked and play an important role in human nutrition, being mostly low in fat and carbohydrates, but high in vitamins, minerals and dietary fiber. Many nutritionists encourage people to consume plenty of fruit and vegetables, five or more portions a day often being recommended.

== Etymology ==
The word vegetable was first recorded in English in the early 15th century. It comes from Old French, and was originally applied to all plants; the word is still used in this sense in biological contexts. It derives from Medieval Latin vegetabilis "growing, flourishing" (i.e. of a plant), a semantic change from a Late Latin meaning "to be enlivening, quickening".

The meaning of "vegetable" as a "plant grown for food" was not established until the 18th century. In 1767, the word was specifically used to mean a "plant cultivated for food, an edible herb or root". The year 1955 saw the first use of the shortened, slang term "veggie".

As an adjective, the word vegetable is used in scientific and technical contexts with a different and much broader meaning, namely of "related to plants" in general, edible or not—as in vegetable matter, vegetable kingdom, vegetable origin, etc.

== Terminology ==
The exact definition of "vegetable" may vary simply because of the many parts of a plant consumed as food worldwide—roots, stems, leaves, flowers, fruits, and seeds. The broadest definition is the word's use adjectivally to mean "matter of plant origin". More specifically, a vegetable may be defined as "any plant, part of which is used for food", a secondary meaning then being "the edible part of such a plant". A more precise definition is "any plant part consumed for food that is not a fruit or seed, but including mature fruits that are eaten as part of a main meal". Falling outside these definitions are edible fungi (such as edible mushrooms) and edible seaweed which, although not parts of plants, are often treated as vegetables.

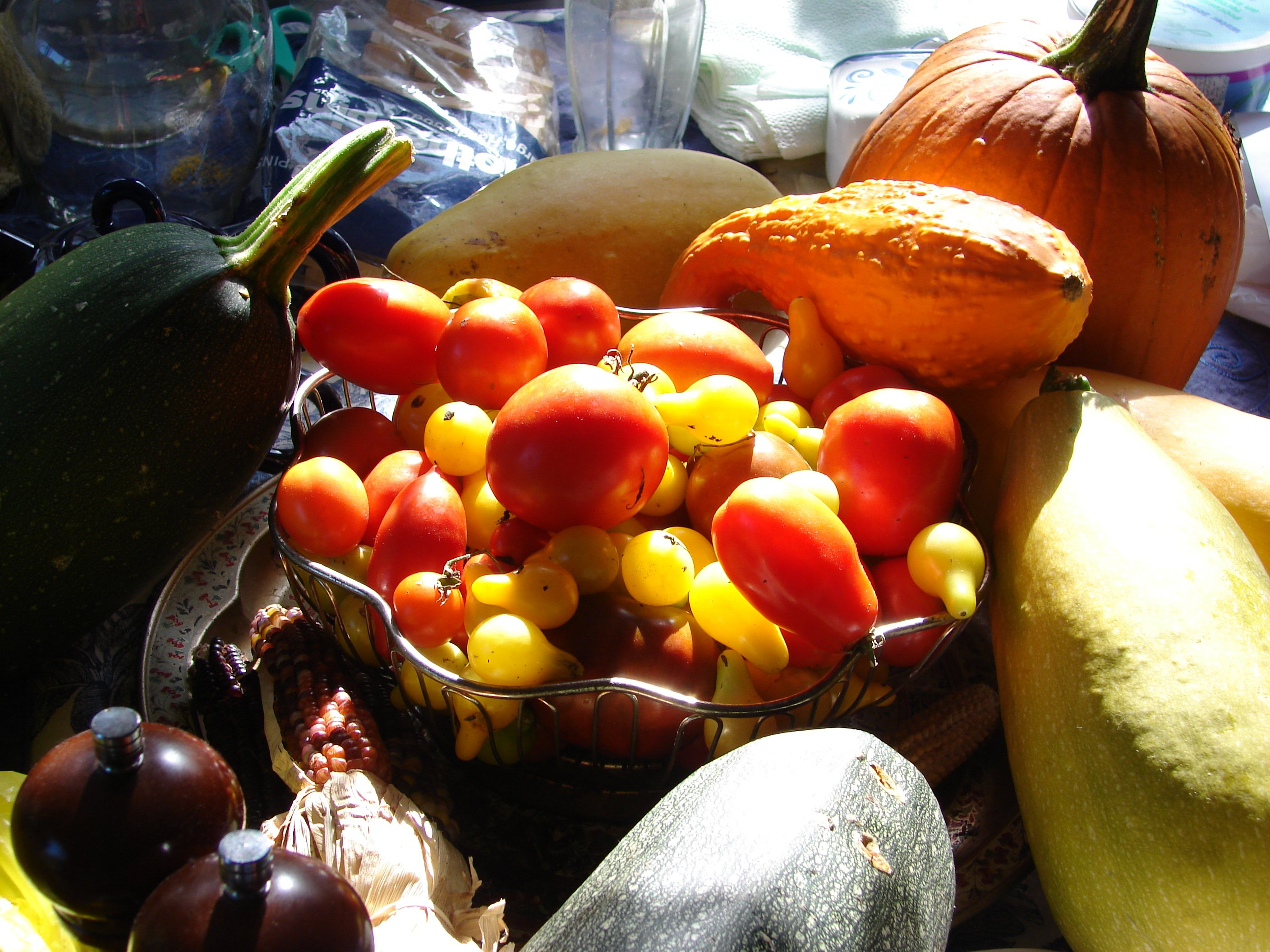
An arrangement of fruits commonly thought of as culinary vegetables, including corn (maize), tomatoes, and various squash

In the latter-mentioned definition of "vegetable", which is used in everyday language, the words "fruit" and "vegetable" are sometimes seen as mutually exclusive. "Fruit" has a precise botanical meaning, being a part that developed from the ovary of a flowering plant. This is considerably different from the word's culinary meaning. While peaches, plums, and oranges are "fruit" in both senses, many items that are vegetables in the common definition, such as eggplants, bell peppers, and tomatoes, are botanically fruits. The question of whether the tomato is a fruit or a vegetable found its way into the United States Supreme Court in 1893. The court ruled unanimously in Nix v. Hedden that a tomato is correctly identified as, and thus taxed as, a vegetable, for the purposes of the Tariff of 1883 on imported produce. However, the court acknowledged that, botanically speaking, a tomato is a fruit.

Plant parts eaten as "vegetables" or as "fruits"
| Botanical part | Examples eaten as "vegetables" | Examples eaten as "fruits" |
|---|---|---|
| Fruit | Aubergine, Bean, Bell pepper, Courgette, Cucumber, Maize, Pea, Pumpkin, Tomato | Apple, Banana, Cherry, Currant, Date, Grape, Melon, Orange, Peach, Plum |
| Stem | | Angelica |
| Petiole (leaf stalk) | Celery | Rhubarb |
| Flower bud | Globe artichoke | |
| Leaf | Cabbage, Lettuce, Spinach | |
| Bulb | Garlic, Onion | |
| Root | Beet, Carrot, Parsnip | |
| Tuber | Cassava, Jerusalem artichoke, Potato, Sweet potato | |

== History ==
Before the advent of agriculture, humans were hunter-gatherers. They foraged for edible fruit, nuts, stems, leaves, corms, and tubers and hunted animals for food. Forest gardening in a tropical jungle clearing is thought to be the first example of agriculture; useful plant species were identified and encouraged to grow while undesirable species were removed. Plant breeding through the selection of strains with desirable traits such as large fruit and vigorous growth soon followed. While the first evidence for the domestication of grasses such as wheat and barley has been found in the Fertile Crescent in the Middle East, it is likely that various peoples around the world started growing crops in the period 10,000 BC to 7,000 BC. Subsistence agriculture continues to this day, with many rural farmers in Africa, Asia, South America, and elsewhere using their plots of land to produce enough food for their families, while any surplus produce is used for exchange for other goods.

Throughout recorded history, the rich have been able to afford a varied diet including meat, vegetables and fruit, but for poor people, meat was a luxury and the food they ate was very dull, typically comprising mainly some staple product made from rice, rye, barley, wheat, millet or maize. The addition of vegetable matter provided some variety to the diet. The staple diet of the Aztecs in Central America was maize and they cultivated tomatoes, avocados, beans, peppers, pumpkins, squashes, peanuts, and amaranth seeds to supplement their tortillas and porridge. In Peru, the Incas subsisted on maize in the lowlands and potatoes at higher altitudes. They also used seeds from quinoa, supplementing their diet with peppers, tomatoes, and avocados.

In ancient China, rice was the staple crop in the south and wheat in the north, the latter made into dumplings, noodles, and pancakes. Vegetables used to accompany these included yams, soybeans, broad beans, turnips, spring onions, and garlic. The diet of the ancient Egyptians was based on bread, often contaminated with sand which wore away their teeth. Meat was a luxury but fish was more plentiful. These were accompanied by a range of vegetables including marrows, broad beans, lentils, onions, leeks, garlic, radishes, and lettuces.

The mainstay of the ancient Greek diet was bread, and this was accompanied by goat's cheese, olives, figs, fish, and occasionally meat. The vegetables grown included onions, garlic, cabbages, melons, and lentils. In ancient Rome, a thick porridge was made of emmer wheat or beans, accompanied by green vegetables but little meat, and fish was not esteemed. The Romans grew broad beans, peas, onions and turnips and ate the leaves of beets rather than their roots.

== Common vegetables ==
Some common vegetables
| Image | Species | Parts used | Origin | Cultivars | World production (×10^{6} tons, 2018) |
|---|---|---|---|---|---|
| | Brassica oleracea | leaves, axillary buds, stems, flower heads | Europe | cabbage, Brussels sprouts, cauliflower, broccoli, kale, kohlrabi, red cabbage, Savoy cabbage, Chinese broccoli, collard greens | 69.4 |
| | Brassica rapa | root, leaves | Asia | turnip, Chinese cabbage, napa cabbage, bok choy | 69.4 |
| | Raphanus sativus | root, leaves, seed pods, seed oil, sprouting | Southeastern Asia | radish, daikon, seedpod varieties | |
| | Daucus carota | root, leaves, stems | Persia | carrot | 40.0 (Note: Includes both carrots and turnips.) |
| | Pastinaca sativa | root | Eurasia | parsnip | |
| | Beta vulgaris | root, leaves | Europe and Near East | beetroot, sea beet, Swiss chard, sugar beet | |
| | Lactuca sativa | leaves, stems, seed oil | Egypt | lettuce, celtuce | 27.2 |
| | Phaseolus vulgaris Phaseolus coccineus Phaseolus lunatus | pods, seeds | Central and South America | green bean, French bean, runner bean, haricot bean, Lima bean | 55.1 (Note: Sum of production of dry and green vegetables.) |
| | Vicia faba | pods, seeds | Mediterranean and Middle East | broad bean | 4.9 |
| | Pisum sativum | pods, seeds, sprouts | Mediterranean and Middle East | pea, snap pea, snow pea, split pea | 34.7 |
| | Solanum tuberosum | tubers | South America | potato | 368.1 |
| | Solanum melongena | fruits | South and East Asia | eggplant (aubergine) | 54.0 |
| | Solanum lycopersicum | fruits | South America | tomato, see list of tomato cultivars | 182.2 |
| | Cucumis sativus | fruits | Southern Asia | cucumber, see list of cucumber varieties | 75.2 |
| | Cucurbita spp. | fruits, flowers | Mesoamerica | pumpkin, squash, marrow, zucchini (courgette), gourd | 27.6 |
| | Allium cepa | bulbs, leaves | Asia | onion, spring onion, scallion, shallot, see list of onion cultivars | 102.2 |
| | Allium sativum | bulbs | Asia | garlic | 28.5 |
| | Allium ampeloprasum | leaf sheaths | Europe and Middle East | leek, elephant garlic | 2.2 |
| | Capsicum annuum | fruits | North and South America | pepper, bell pepper, sweet pepper | 40.9 |
| | Spinacia oleracea | leaves | Central and southwestern Asia | spinach | 26.3 |
| | Dioscorea spp. | tubers | Tropical Africa | yam | 72.6 |
| | Ipomoea batatas | tubers, leaves, shoots | Central and South America | sweet potato, see list of sweet potato cultivars | 91.9 |
| | Manihot esculenta | tubers | South America | cassava | 277.8 |

== Nutrition and health ==
Vegetable consumption per capita

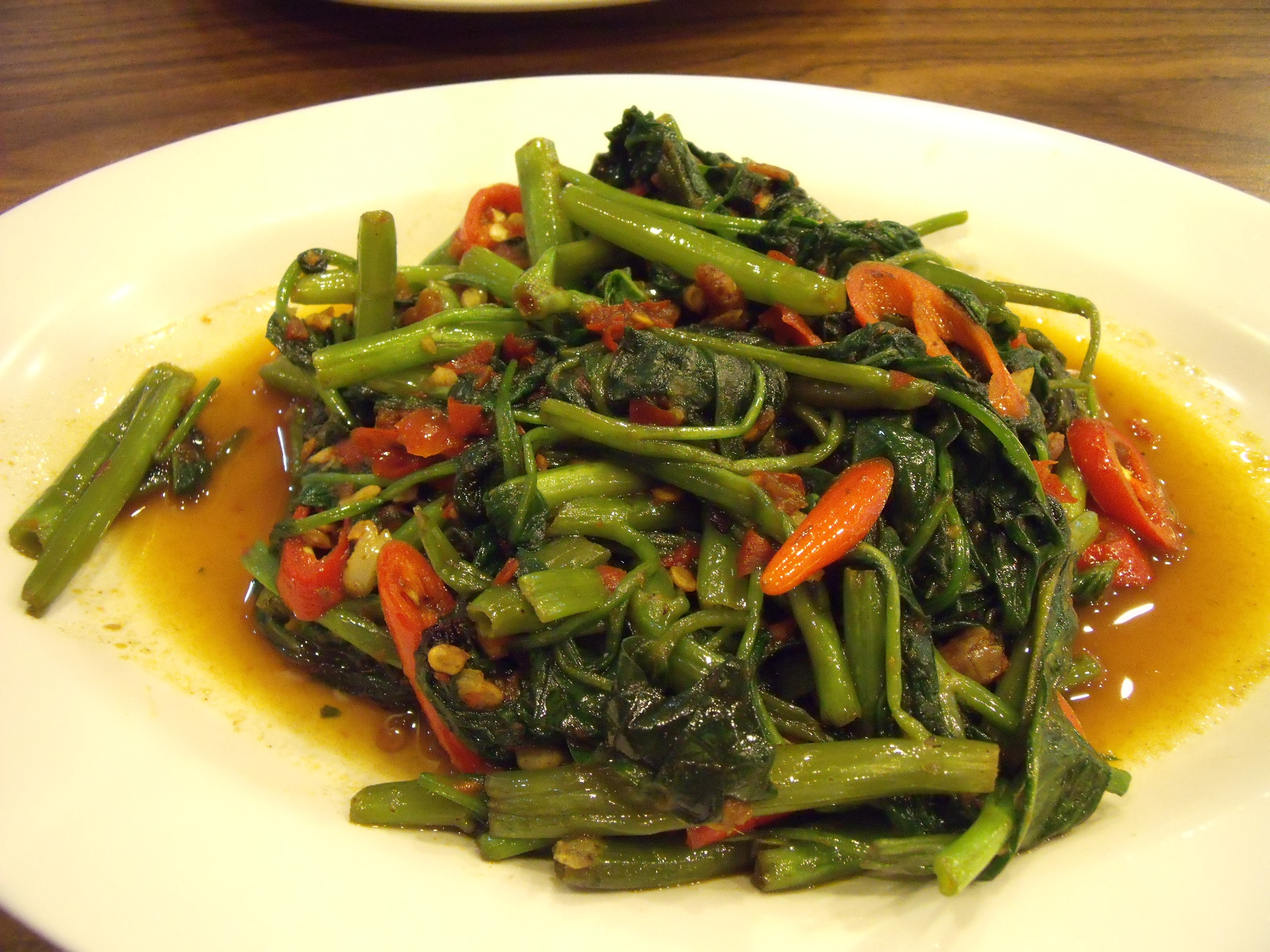
Southeast Asian-style stir-fried Ipomoea aquatica in chili and sambal

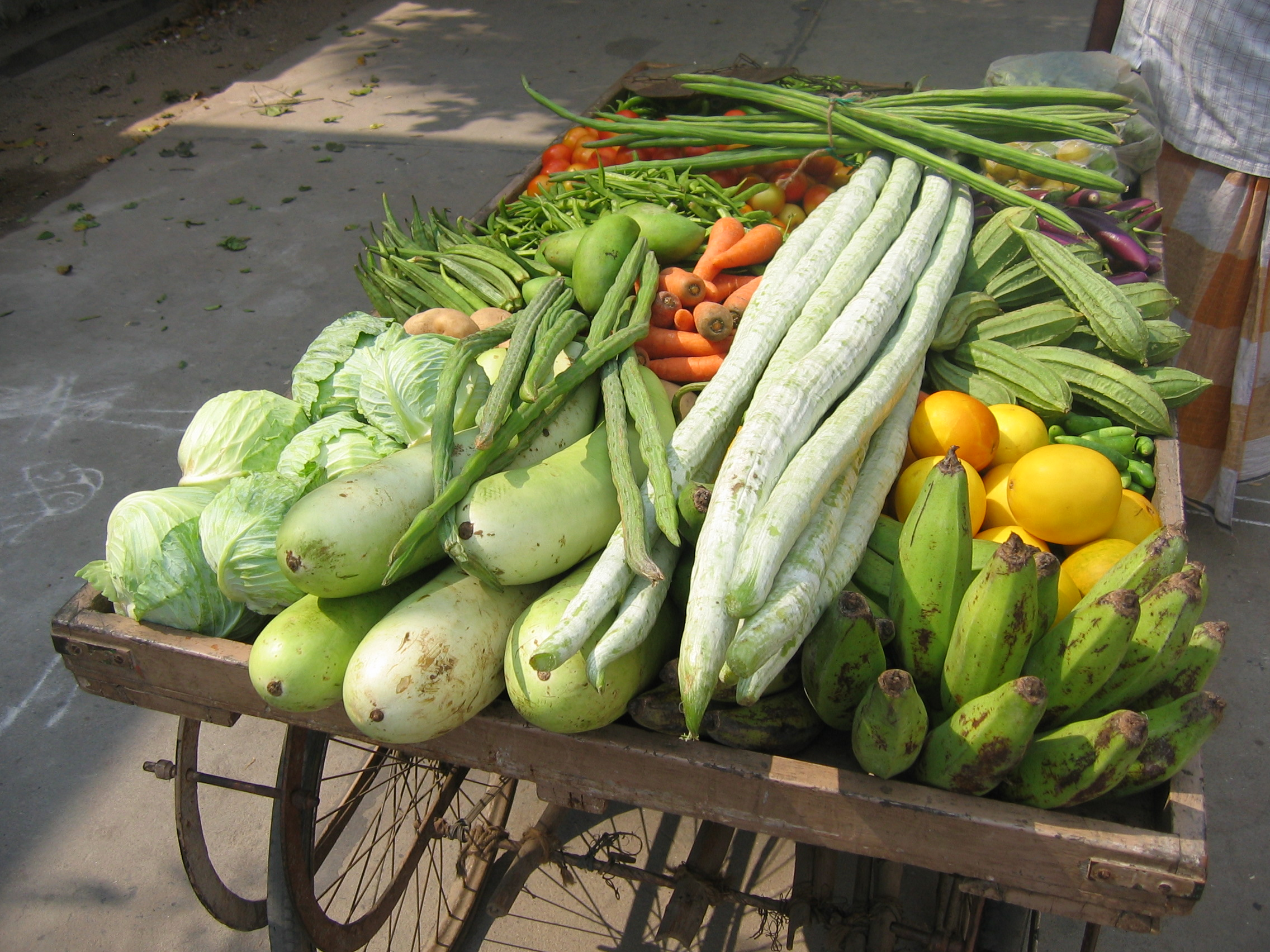
Vegetables (and some fruit) for sale on a street in Guntur, India

Cost comparison of vegetables compared to other food groups, 2021

Vegetables play an important role in human nutrition. Most are low in fat and calories but are bulky and filling. They supply dietary fiber and are important sources of essential vitamins, minerals, and trace elements. Particularly important are the antioxidant vitamins A, C, and E. When vegetables are included in the diet, there is found to be a reduction in the incidence of cancer, stroke, cardiovascular disease, and other chronic ailments. Research has shown that, compared with individuals who eat less than three servings of fruits and vegetables each day, those that eat more than five servings have an approximately twenty percent lower risk of developing coronary heart disease or stroke. The nutritional content of vegetables varies considerably; some contain useful amounts of protein though generally they contain little fat, and varying proportions of vitamins such as vitamin A, vitamin K, and vitamin B_{6}; provitamins; dietary minerals; and carbohydrates.

The consumption of crunchy and hard to chew foods, such as raw vegetables, during youth, while the bones are still growing, is needed for the human's, and other animals', jaws' proper development, and without their consumption, the jaws do not grow to their full size, thus not leaving enough room for the teeth to grow in correctly, causing crooked and impacted teeth.

However, vegetables often also contain toxins and antinutrients which interfere with the absorption of nutrients. These include α-solanine, α-chaconine, enzyme inhibitors (of cholinesterase, protease, amylase, etc.), cyanide and cyanide precursors, oxalic acid, tannins and others. These toxins are natural defenses, used to ward off the insects, predators and fungi that might attack the plant. Some beans contain phytohaemagglutinin, and cassava roots contain cyanogenic glycoside as do bamboo shoots. These toxins can be deactivated by adequate cooking. Green potatoes contain glycoalkaloids and should be avoided.

Fruit and vegetables, particularly leafy vegetables, have been implicated in nearly half the gastrointestinal infections caused by norovirus in the United States. These foods are commonly eaten raw and may become contaminated during their preparation by an infected food handler. Hygiene is important when handling foods to be eaten raw, and such products need to be properly cleaned, handled, and stored to limit contamination.

=== Recommendations ===
The USDA Dietary Guidelines for Americans recommends consuming five to nine servings of fruit and vegetables daily. The total amount consumed will vary according to age and gender, and is determined based upon the standard portion sizes typically consumed, as well as general nutritional content. Potatoes are not included in the count as they are mainly providers of starch. For most vegetables and vegetable juices, one serving is half of a cup and can be eaten raw or cooked. For leafy greens, such as lettuce and spinach, a single serving is typically a full cup. A variety of products should be chosen as no single fruit or vegetable provides all the nutrients needed for health.

International dietary guidelines are similar to the ones established by the USDA. Japan, for example, recommends the consumption of five to six servings of vegetables daily. French recommendations provide similar guidelines and set the daily goal at five servings. In India, the daily recommendation for adults is 275 grams (9.7 oz) of vegetables per day.

== Production ==
=== Cultivation ===
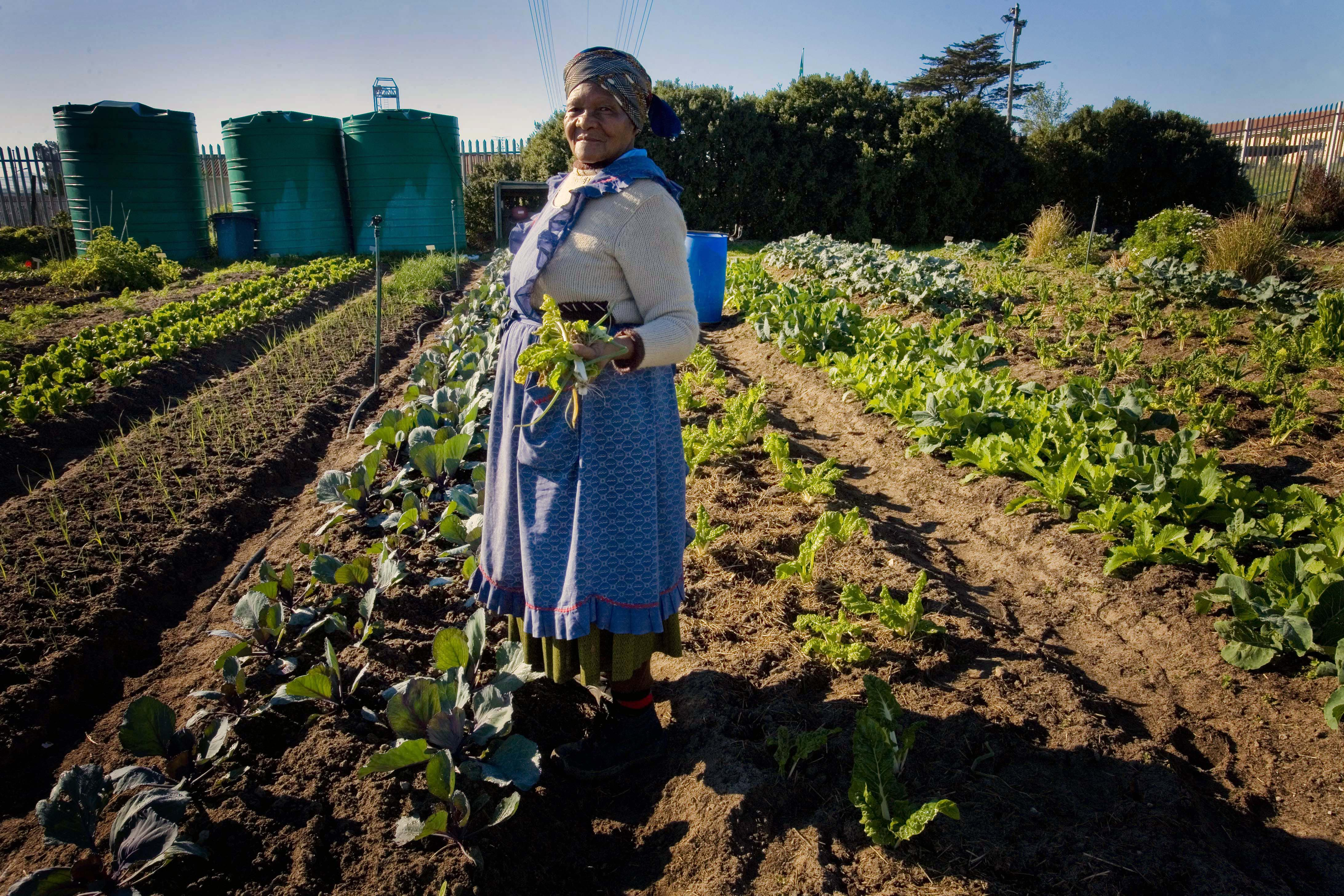
Growing vegetables in South Africa

Fresh vegetables from garden in Croatia

Vegetables have been part of the human diet from time immemorial. Some are staple foods but most are accessory foodstuffs, adding variety to meals with their unique flavors and at the same time, adding nutrients necessary for health. Some vegetables are perennials but most are annuals and biennials, usually harvested within a year of sowing or planting. Whatever system is used for growing crops, cultivation follows a similar pattern; preparation of the soil by loosening it, removing or burying weeds, and adding organic manures or fertilisers; sowing seeds or planting young plants; tending the crop while it grows to reduce weed competition, control pests, and provide sufficient water; harvesting the crop when it is ready; sorting, storing, and marketing the crop or eating it fresh from the ground.

Different soil types suit different crops, but in general in temperate climates, sandy soils dry out fast but warm up quickly in the spring and are suitable for early crops, while heavy clays retain moisture better and are more suitable for late season crops. The growing season can be lengthened by the use of fleece, cloches, plastic mulch, polytunnels, and greenhouses. In hotter regions, the production of vegetables is constrained by the climate, especially the pattern of rainfall, while in temperate zones, it is constrained by the temperature and day length.

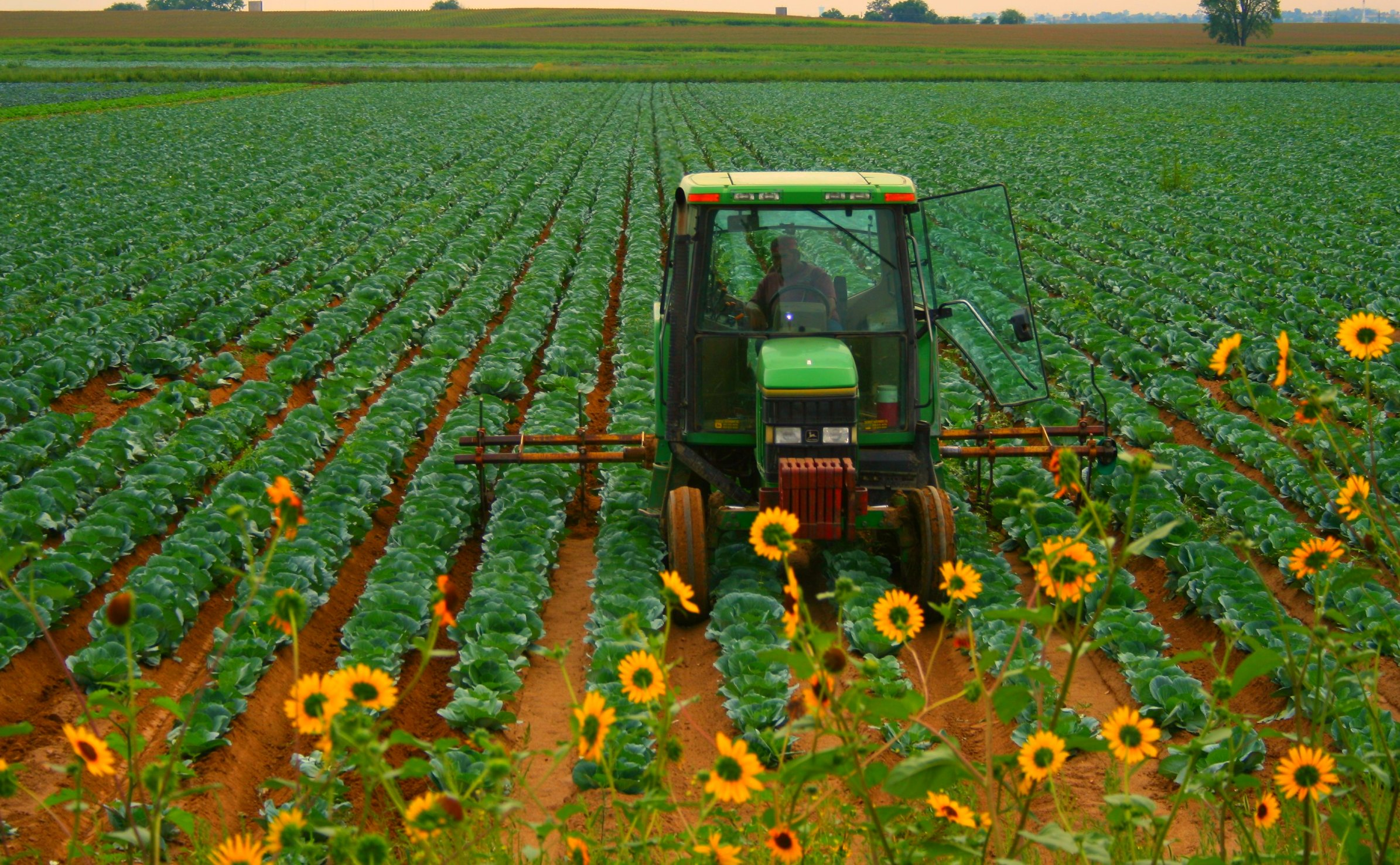
Weeding cabbages in Colorado, US

On a domestic scale, the spade, fork, and hoe are the tools of choice while on commercial farms a range of mechanical equipment is available. Besides tractors, these include ploughs, harrows, drills, transplanters, cultivators, irrigation equipment, and harvesters. New techniques are changing the cultivation procedures involved in growing vegetables with computer monitoring systems, GPS locators, and self-steer programs for driverless machines giving economic benefits.

=== Harvesting ===
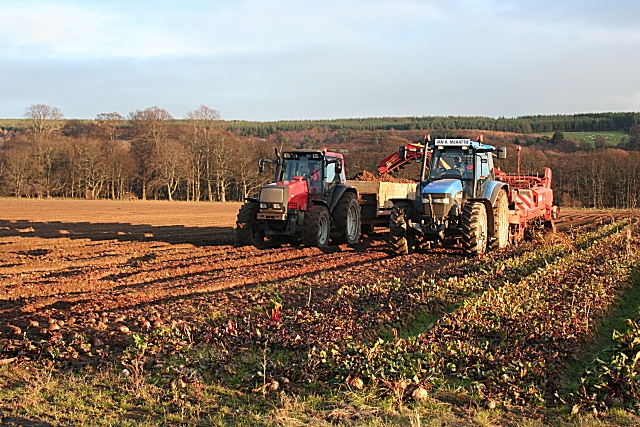
Harvesting beetroot in the United Kingdom

When a vegetable is harvested, it is cut off from its source of water and nourishment. It continues to transpire and loses moisture as it does so, a process most noticeable in the wilting of green leafy crops. Harvesting root vegetables when they are fully mature improves their storage life, but alternatively, these root crops can be left in the ground and harvested over an extended period. The harvesting process should seek to minimise damage and bruising to the crop. Onions and garlic can be dried for a few days in the field and root crops such as potatoes benefit from a short maturation period in warm, moist surroundings, during which time wounds heal and the skin thickens up and hardens. Before marketing or storage, grading needs to be done to remove damaged goods and select produce according to its quality, size, ripeness, and color.

=== Storage ===
All vegetables benefit from proper post harvest care. A large proportion of vegetables and perishable foods are lost after harvest during the storage period. These losses may be as high as thirty to fifty percent in developing countries where adequate cold storage facilities are not available. The main causes of loss include spoilage caused by moisture, moulds, micro-organisms, and vermin.

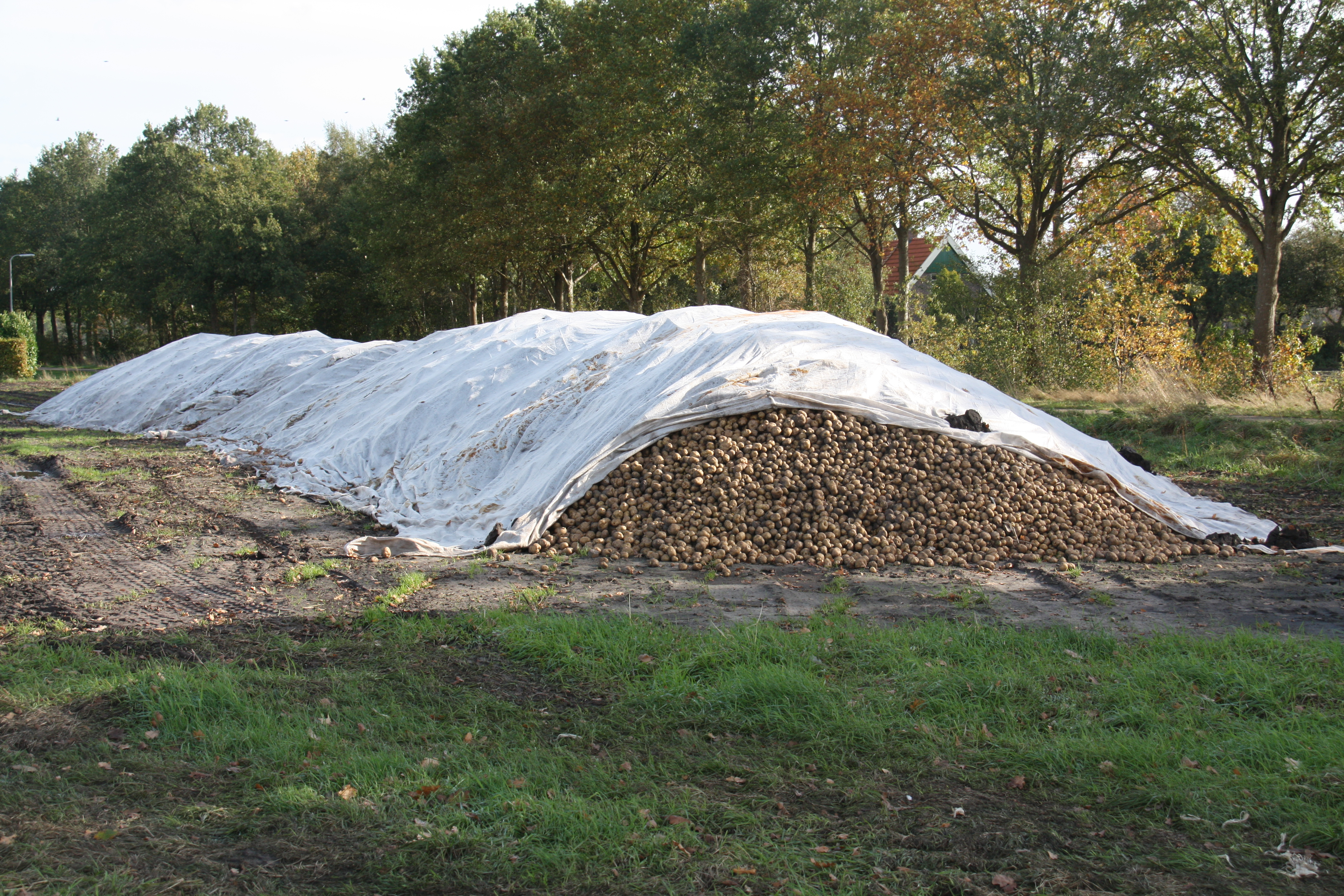
Temporary storage of potatoes in the Netherlands

Storage can be short-term or long-term. Most vegetables are perishable and short-term storage for a few days provides flexibility in marketing. During storage, leafy vegetables lose moisture, and the vitamin C in them degrades rapidly. A few products such as potatoes and onions have better keeping qualities and can be sold when higher prices may be available, and by extending the marketing season, a greater total volume of crop can be sold. If refrigerated storage is not available, the priority for most crops is to store high-quality produce, to maintain a high humidity level, and to keep the produce in the shade.

Proper post-harvest storage aimed at extending and ensuring shelf life is best effected by efficient cold chain application. Cold storage is particularly useful for vegetables such as cauliflower, eggplant, lettuce, radish, spinach, potatoes, and tomatoes, the optimum temperature depending on the type of produce. There are temperature-controlling technologies that do not require the use of electricity such as evaporative cooling. Storage of fruit and vegetables in controlled atmospheres with high levels of carbon dioxide or high oxygen levels can inhibit microbial growth and extend storage life.

The irradiation of vegetables and other agricultural produce by ionizing radiation can be used to preserve it from both microbial infection and insect damage, as well as from physical deterioration. It can extend the storage life of food without noticeably changing its properties.

=== Preservation ===
The objective of preserving vegetables is to extend their availability for consumption or marketing purposes. The aim is to harvest the food at its maximum state of palatability and nutritional value, and preserve these qualities for an extended period. The main causes of deterioration in vegetables after they are gathered are the actions of naturally occurring enzymes and the spoilage caused by micro-organisms. Canning and freezing are the most commonly used techniques, and vegetables preserved by these methods are generally similar in nutritional value to comparable fresh products with regards to carotenoids, vitamin E, minerals. and dietary fiber.

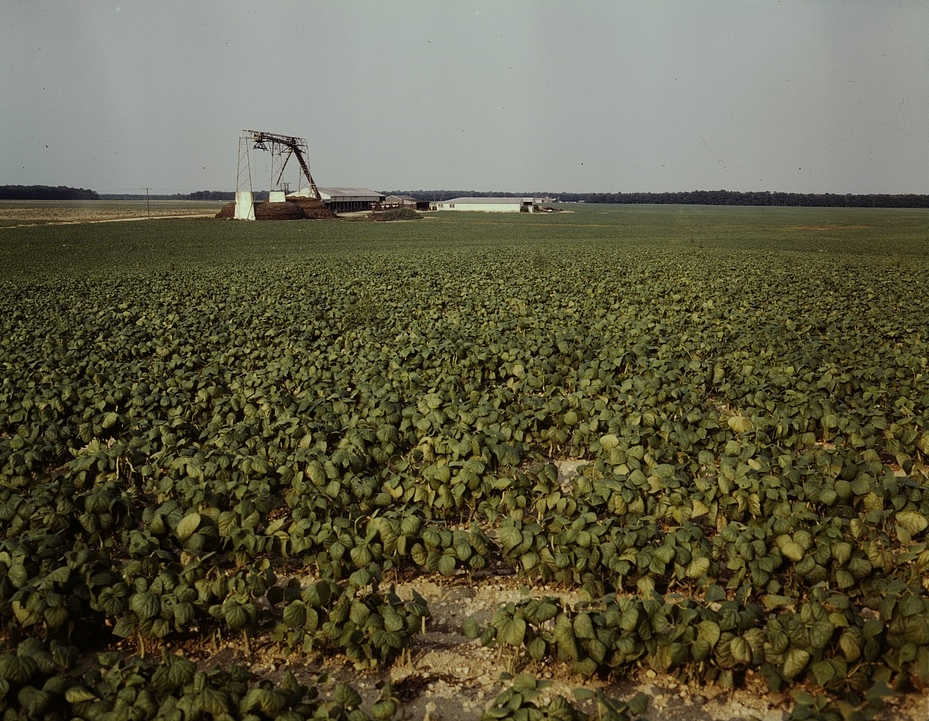
Bean field and canning factory, New Jersey, US

Canning is a process during which the enzymes in vegetables are deactivated and the micro-organisms present killed by heat. The sealed can excludes air from the foodstuff to prevent subsequent deterioration. The lowest necessary heat and the minimum processing time are used in order to prevent the mechanical breakdown of the product and to preserve the flavor as far as is possible. The can is then able to be stored at ambient temperatures for a long period.

Freezing vegetables and maintaining their temperature at below −10 °C (14 °F) will prevent their spoilage for a short period, whereas a temperature of −18 °C (0 °F) is required for longer-term storage. The enzyme action will merely be inhibited, and blanching of suitably sized prepared vegetables before freezing mitigates this and prevents off-flavors developing. Not all micro-organisms will be killed at these temperatures and after thawing the vegetables should be used promptly because otherwise, any microbes present may proliferate.

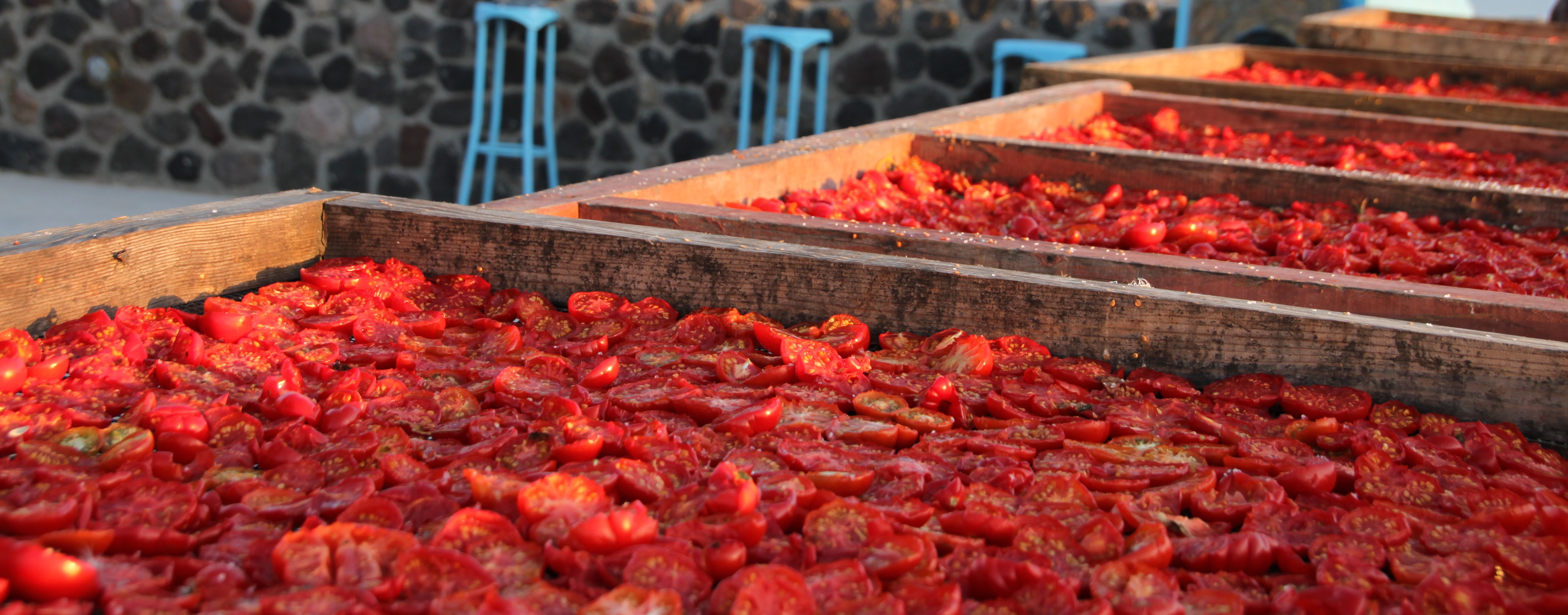
Sun-drying tomatoes in Greece

Traditionally, sun drying has been used for some products such as tomatoes, mushrooms, and beans, spreading the produce on racks and turning the crop at intervals. This method suffers from several disadvantages including lack of control over drying rates, spoilage when drying is slow, contamination by dirt, wetting by rain, and attack by rodents, birds, and insects. These disadvantages can be alleviated by using solar powered driers. The dried produce must be prevented from reabsorbing moisture during storage.

High levels of both sugar and salt can preserve food by preventing micro-organisms from growing. Green beans can be salted by layering the pods with salt, but this method of preservation is unsuited to most vegetables. Marrows, beetroot, carrot, and some other vegetables can be boiled with sugar to create jams. Vinegar is widely used in food preservation; a sufficient concentration of acetic acid prevents the development of destructive micro-organisms, a fact made use of in the preparation of pickles, chutneys and relishes. Fermentation is another method of preserving vegetables for later use. Sauerkraut is made from chopped cabbage and relies on lactic acid bacteria which produce compounds that are inhibitory to the growth of other micro-organisms.

=== Top producers ===
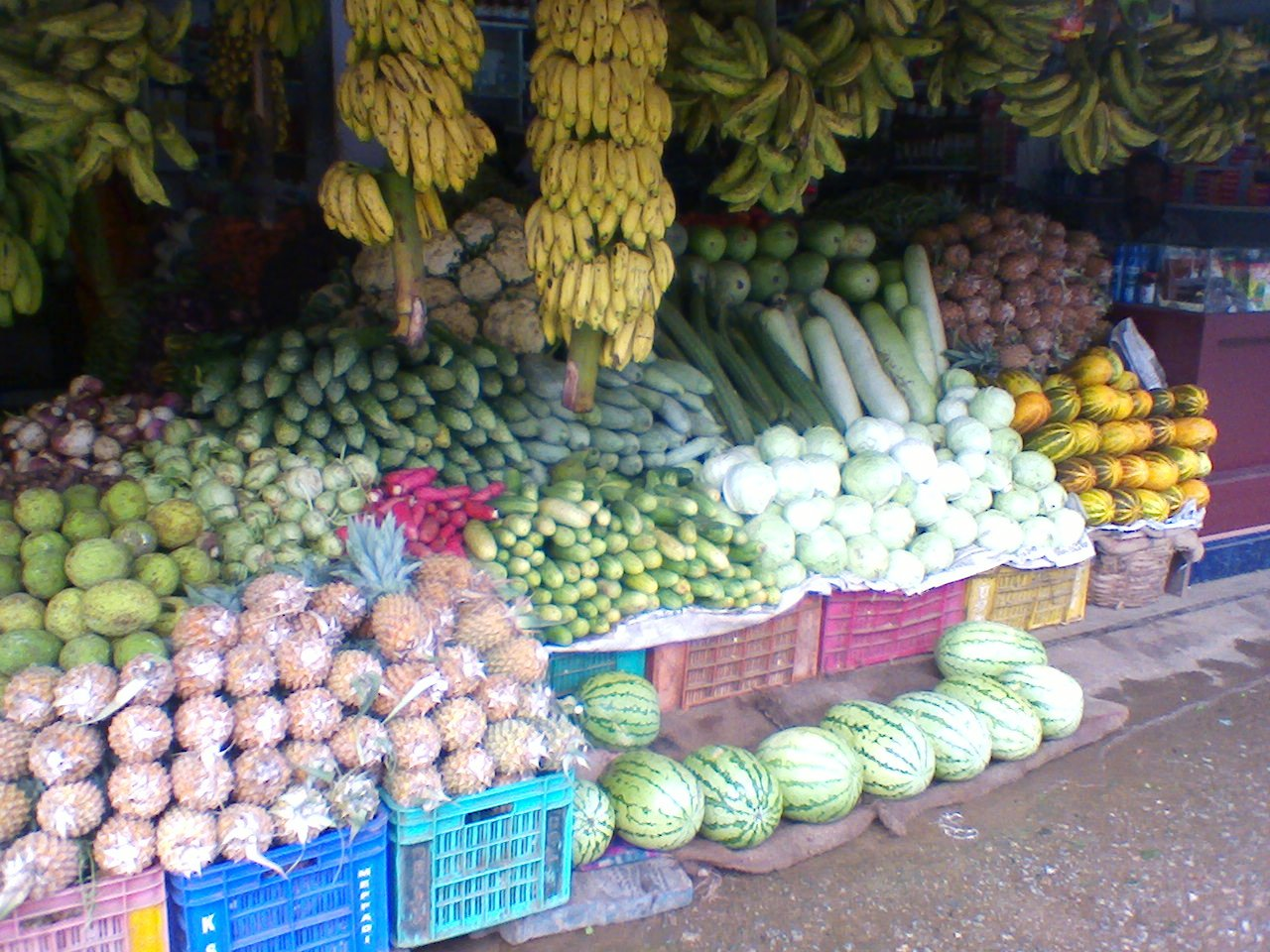
Vegetable shop in India

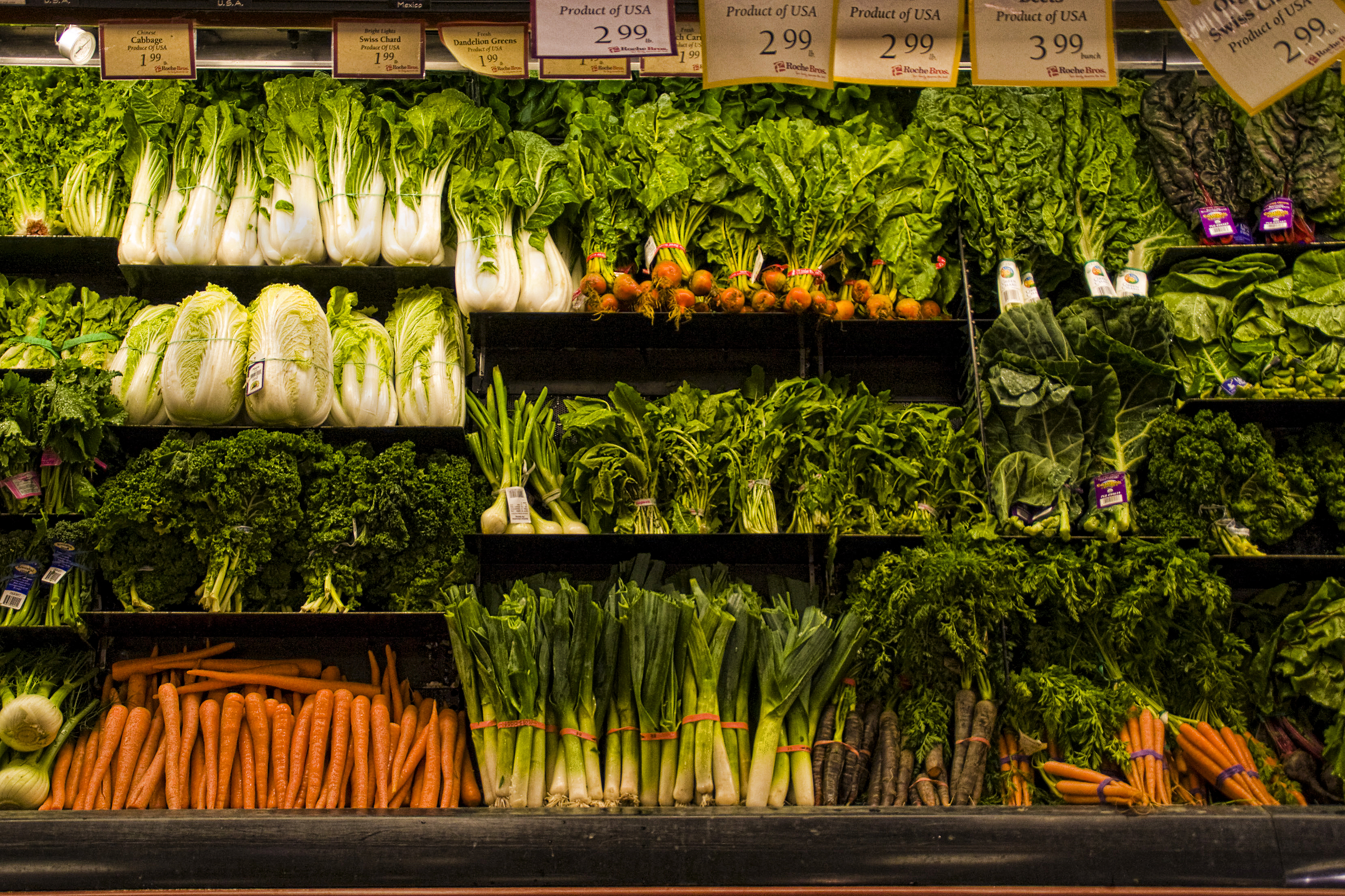
Vegetables in a supermarket in the United States

In 2010, China was the largest vegetable producing nation, with over half the world's production. India, the United States, Turkey, Iran, and Egypt were the next largest producers. China had the highest area of land devoted to vegetable production, while the highest average yields were obtained in Spain and the Republic of Korea.

| Country | Area cultivated thousand hectares (2,500 acres) | Yield thousand kg/ha (890 lb/acre) | Production thousand tonnes (1,100 short tons) |
|---|---|---|---|
| China | 23,458 | 230 | 539,993 |
| India | 7,256 | 138 | 100,045 |
| United States | 1,120 | 318 | 35,609 |
| Turkey | 1,090 | 238 | 25,901 |
| Iran | 767 | 261 | 19,995 |
| Egypt | 755 | 251 | 19,487 |
| Italy | 537 | 265 | 14,201 |
| Russia | 759 | 175 | 13,283 |
| Spain | 348 | 364 | 12,679 |
| Mexico | 681 | 184 | 12,515 |
| Nigeria | 1844 | 64 | 11,830 |
| Brazil | 500 | 225 | 11,233 |
| Japan | 407 | 264 | 10,746 |
| Indonesia | 1082 | 90 | 9,780 |
| South Korea | 268 | 364 | 9,757 |
| Vietnam | 818 | 110 | 8,976 |
| Ukraine | 551 | 162 | 8,911 |
| Uzbekistan | 220 | 342 | 7,529 |
| Philippines | 718 | 88 | 6,299 |
| France | 245 | 227 | 5,572 |
| Total world | 55,598 | 188 | 1,044,380 |

Vegetable yield

Production of vegetables

== Standards ==
The International Organization for Standardization (ISO) sets international standards to ensure that products and services are safe, reliable, and of good quality. There are a number of ISO standards regarding fruits and vegetables. ISO 1991-1:1982 lists the botanical names of sixty-one species of plants used as vegetables along with the common names of the vegetables in English, French, and Russian. ISO 67.080.20 covers the storage and transport of vegetables and their derived products.

== See also ==
- List of vegetable dishes
- List of vegetables
- Market gardening
- Perennial vegetable
- Post-harvest losses (vegetables)
- Vegetable carving
- Plant Resources of Tropical Africa
- World Vegetable Center
