= Row cover =

Material used in agriculture and gardening

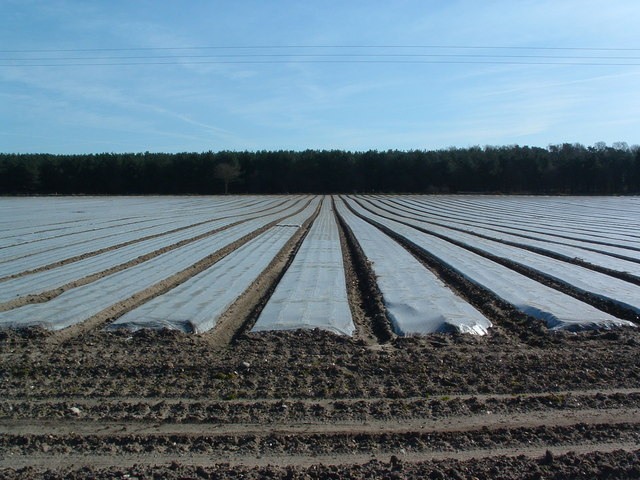
Row covers in a field

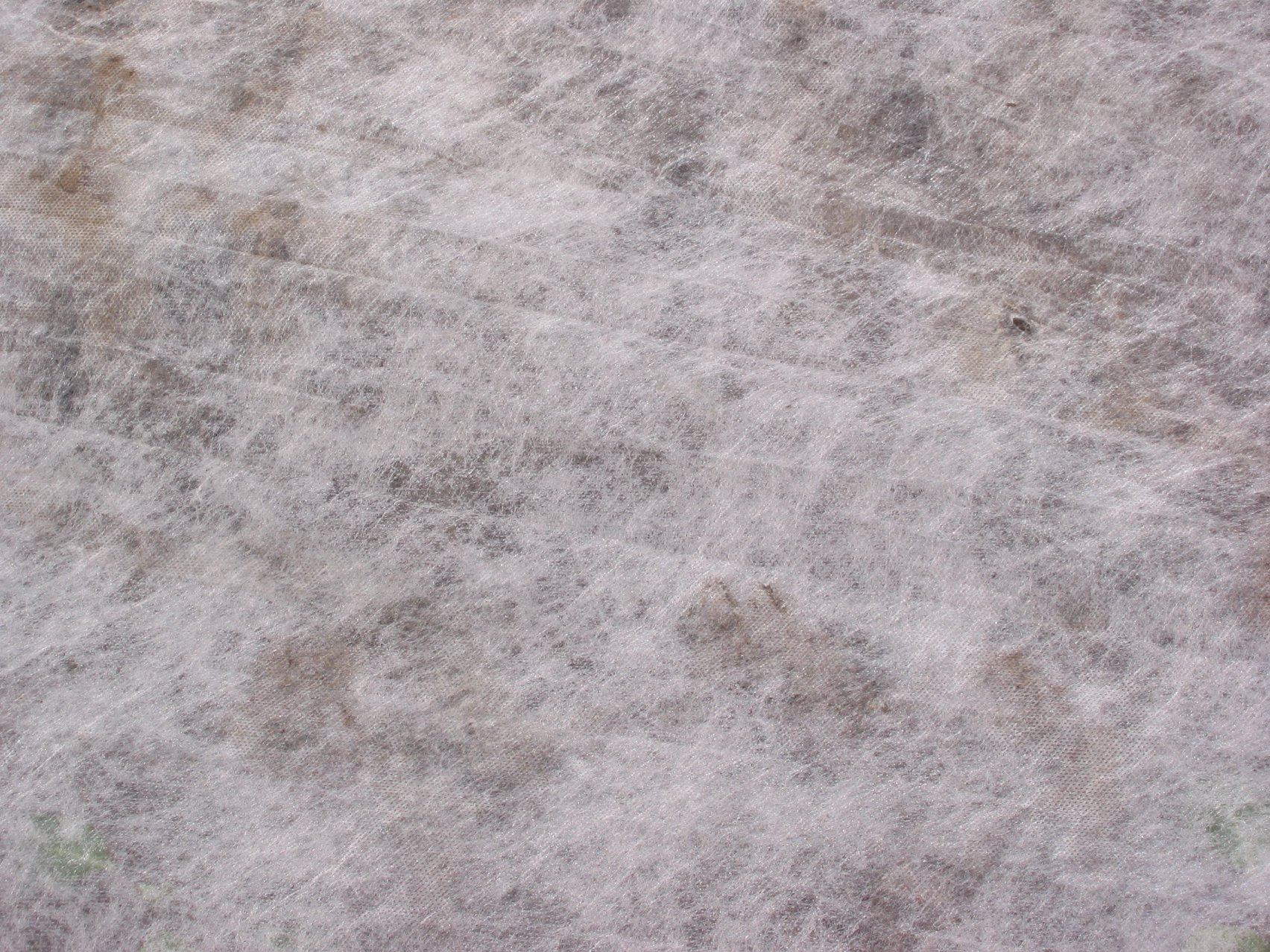
Horticultural fleece

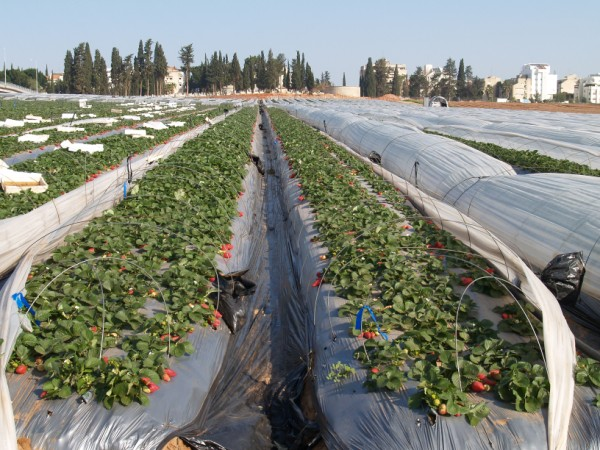
Strawberry crop showing row covers and their support structure

In agriculture and gardening, row cover is any transparent or semi-transparent flexible material, like fabric or plastic sheeting, used as a protective covering for plants, usually vegetables. Covers are used to extend growing seasons, and reduce undesirable effects of cold, wind and insects. Row covers can reduce the drying effect of wind, and can provide a small amount of warming in a similar way to unheated cold frames, greenhouses and polytunnels, creating a microclimate for the plants.

The first commercial-scale use of polyethylene row covers in the US was in the 1950s, and by the 1980s their use was widespread.

Row cover is a lightweight synthetic, such as clear plastic (polyethylene) or spunbonded polyester called horticultural fleece. Plastic covers are elevated above plants on a supporting framework such as wire hoops to form a low tunnel. (Plastic placed directly on the ground is mulch.) Fleece covers can be placed directly on plants or on supporting frames. Floating row cover is the term used when there are no (or minimal) supports under the fleece and the plants themselves hold up the fleece, though the edges may be anchored to the ground against wind by metal staples or soil piled up over the edges.

All row cover materials reduce the amount of light reaching the plants by a small amount (for example, 10%–20%), but such materials do not reduce sunlight in the way shade cloth does (50%–95% shading). Commercial products are marketed describing the percentage of light reduction.

In hot weather, plastic covers need to be vented to prevent heat-buildup or too much moisture under the cover, and may have built in vent holes. Fleece material is self-venting and will allow water and rain to penetrate the cover.

Row covers provide better frost protection in the fall than spring because the heat built up in the soil over summer will help to raise the temperature a few degrees under a cover. Fleece covers can protect against certain destructive insects but must be removed when the crop is flowering if insect pollination is required.

== See also ==
- Horticultural fleece
- Plastic mulch
- Cloche (agriculture)
- Technical textile
