= Season extension =

Crop growing method

Season extension in agriculture is any method that allows a crop to be grown beyond its normal outdoor growing season and harvesting time frame, or the extra time thus achieved. To extend the growing season into the colder months, one can use unheated techniques such as floating row covers, low tunnels, caterpillar tunnels, or hoophouses. However, even if colder temperatures are mitigated, most crops will stop growing when the days become shorter than 10 hours, and resume after winter as the daylight increases above 10 hours. A hothouse—a greenhouse which is heated and illuminated—creates an environment where plants are fooled into thinking it is their normal growing season. Though this is a form of season extension for the grower, it is not the usual meaning of the term.

Season extension can apply to other climates, where conditions other than cold and shortened periods of sunlight end the growing year (e.g. a rainy season).

== Structures ==
- Unheated greenhouses (also known as cold houses) offer protection from the weather, such as sub-optimal temperatures, freezing or drying winds, damaging wind gusts, frost, snow and ice. Unheated greenhouses can extend the growing season of cold hardy vegetables well into the fall and sometimes even through winter until spring. Sometimes supplementary heating is appropriate when temperatures inside the greenhouse drop below 32 degrees Fahrenheit.
- Passive heated or low-energy greenhouses: Using principles of passive solar building design and including thermal mass will help keep an otherwise unheated greenhouse several degrees warmer at night and on overcast days. Other systems such as ground-coupled heat exchangers, thermal chimneys, thermosiphons, or "climate batteries" can also be used to take ground-stored heat and use it to help heat a greenhouse.
- Polytunnels (hoop houses): Whereas a greenhouse has a frame and is glazed with glass or stiff polycarbonate sheets, polytunnels are built with thin polyethylene plastic sheeting stretched over curved frameworks, often extending as long "tunnels". Low tunnels are short enough that a person cannot walk inside them, perhaps 2 to 4 feet tall, and the plastic must be lifted to access the plants. High tunnels are commercial-sized buildings, tall enough to walk through without bending and sometimes tall enough to operate tractors inside. Sometimes polytunnels are built with two layers of plastic sheeting and air blown in between them; this increases the insulation factor, but also cuts down on the amount of sunlight reaching the plants.
- Row covers are lightweight fabrics placed over plants to retain heat and can provide several degrees of frost protection. Row covers, being fabric, allow rain to permeate the material, and also allow plants to transpire without holding in the moisture (as happens under plastic sheeting). Row cover material can be laid directly onto the crop (floating row covers), or laid over a framework of hoops or wires. Row covers can be set up outside of any protective structure or placed over crops within high tunnels or greenhouses. In its simplest function, it allows a light frost to form on the cover instead of on the leaves beneath. Outside row covers must be clipped or pinned in place or weighted down on the edges. Inside row covers may be draped to the ground without further attachment.
- Cold frames are transparent-roofed enclosures, built low to the ground, used to protect plants from cold weather. Cold frames are found in home gardens and in vegetable farming. They are most often used for growing seedlings that are later transplanted into open ground. A typical cold frame has traditionally been a rectangle of framing lumber with an old window placed over it. Since the advent of plastic sheeting, it is often used instead of old windows.
- Temporary coverings: In smaller gardens almost any type of cover, including glass cloches, newspaper cones, baskets, miscellaneous bits of plastic, and mulches such as hay, leaves, or straw can be used as frost-protection that is pulled on and off each day when frost is likely to occur overnight.

== Other methods ==
- Hotbeds: a mass of hot compost is used for the heat it gives off to warm a nearby plant. Typically a few centimetres of soil are placed on top of the compost mass, and the plant grows there, above the rising heat.
- Mulches: many a material placed on the soil around plants will help retain heat. Organic mulches include straw, compost, etc. Synthetic mulches, typically, plastic sheeting with slits through which plants grow, is used extensively in large-scale vegetable growing. When the plastic is black, its color may absorb more solar heat, but if the plastic is clear, it may provide a greenhouse effect; both concepts are touted in discussions of mulching, usually without citations of any field trials that might clarify which to choose. Organic mulches, in addition to retaining heat by insulating, can potentially also add some heat from their decomposition, although they must be properly chosen, as factors such as thermal or chemical "burning" (excess heat, acidity, or both) and coliform bacteria accompany animal manure used as row-crop mulch. One principle involved is to prefer aged compost over fresh compost for this purpose, as its earlier predigestion by soil microbes ends the early phase of intense heat, low pH, and gut bacteria dominance but still leaves a bit more exothermic potential available.
- Raised beds: beds where the soil has been loosened and piled a few inches to more than a foot above the surrounding area heat more quickly in spring, allowing earlier planting.
