= Pet tree =

Keyring or mobile phone accessory

A pet tree is a kind of keyring or mobile phone accessory that contains a very small cactus or succulent plant in a bell jar. The plant can be watered and, once it grows too large for the accessory, can be removed so that it may continue growing. Pet trees are popular in Japan, but are also available in the West.
