= Abhinav Farmers Club =

Abhinav Farmers Club is a national award-winning group farming initiative located in Mulshi taluka, of Pune district of Maharashtra a state in India. The club started with 850 farmers in Maharashtra cultivating about 143 hectares of land. It was conceptualised by NABARD, in April 2012, the club had 4,600 members belonging to the states of Maharashtra, Madhya Pradesh, Gujarat and Uttar Pradesh. The club was set up in 2004. It received a national award for its activities in 2008. The club was started by Dnyaneshwar Bodke, who is its chief volunteer. The club grows flowers and organic vegetables in polyhouses, it sells its produce to retail outlets in Mumbai and New Delhi.

During COVID-19 pandemic in India they used extensively the Locacart app for seamless delivery of vegetables and fruits thorough e-commerce, developed by IIT Mumbai.

It is assisting over 150 households in the city of Pune to grow their own vegetables on vegetable patches in balconies and terraces of flats and in pots.
