= Bell jar =

Glass jar used in scientific experiments

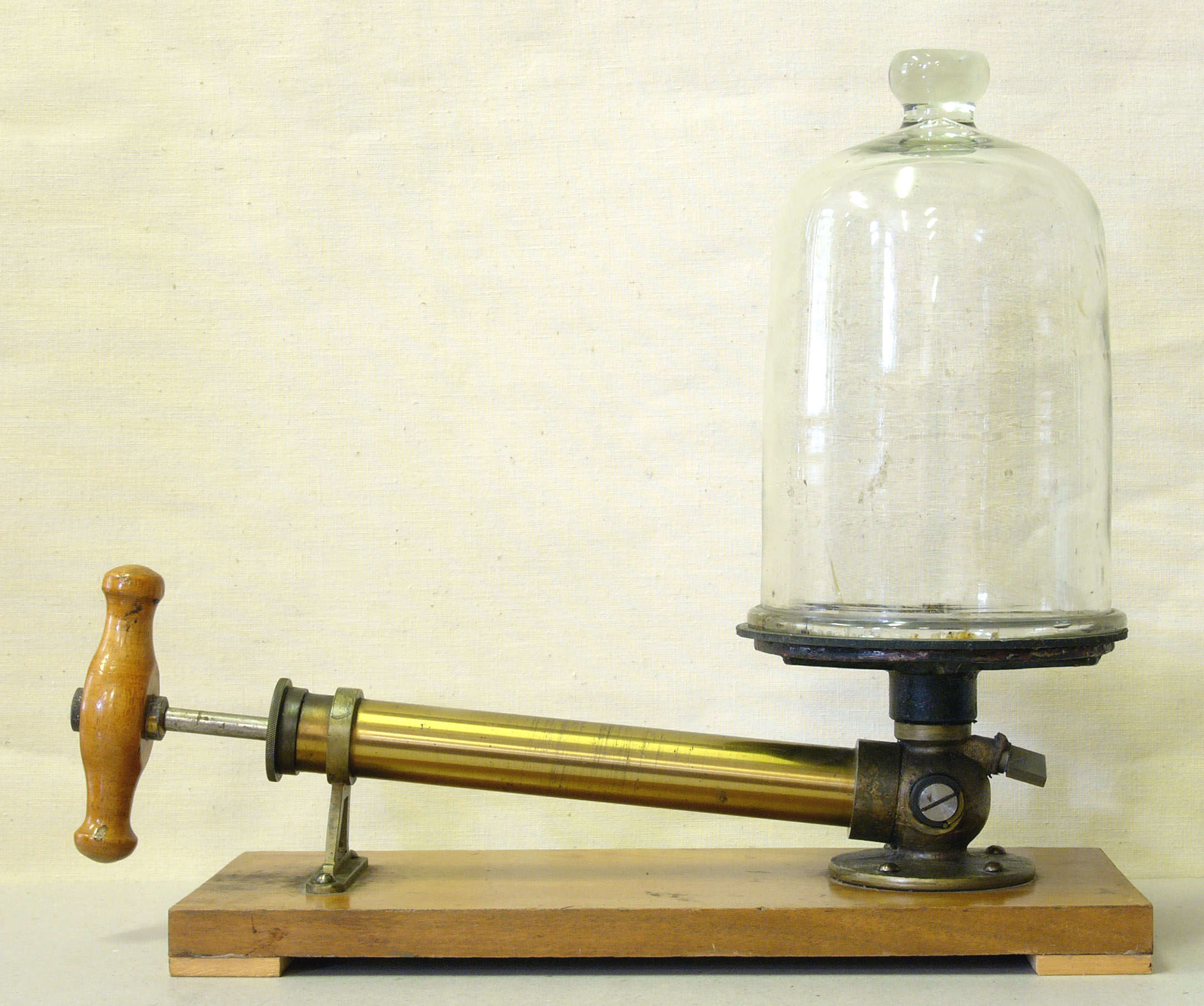
- Early 20th-century bell jar with a vacuum pump
- Uses: Enclosing objects, containing gases or a vacuum

A bell jar is a glass jar, similar in shape to a bell (i.e. in its best-known form it is open at the bottom, while its top and sides together are a single piece), and can be manufactured from a variety of materials (ranging from glass to different types of metals). Bell jars are often used in laboratories to form and contain a vacuum. It is a common science apparatus used in experiments. Bell jars have a limited ability to create strong vacuums; vacuum chambers are available when higher performance is needed. They have been used to demonstrate the effect of vacuum on sound propagation.

In addition to their scientific applications, bell jars may also serve as display cases or transparent dust covers. In these situations, the bell jar is not usually placed under vacuum.

== Vacuum ==
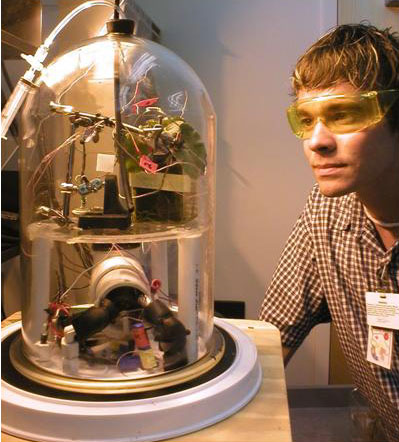
A bell jar operating below atmospheric pressure

A vacuum bell jar is placed on a base which is vented to a hose fitting, that can be connected via a hose to a vacuum pump. A vacuum is formed by pumping the air out of the bell jar.

The lower edge of a vacuum bell jar forms a flange of heavy glass, ground smooth on the bottom for better contact. The base of the jar is equally heavy and flattened. A smear of vacuum grease is usually applied between them. As the vacuum forms inside, it creates a considerable compression force, so there is no need to clamp the seal. For this reason, a bell jar cannot be used to contain pressures above atmospheric, only below.

Bell jars are generally used for classroom demonstrations or by hobbyists, when only a relatively low-quality vacuum is required. Cutting-edge research done at ultra-high vacuum requires a more sophisticated vacuum chamber. However, several tests may be completed in a bell jar chamber having an effective pump and low leak rate.

Some of the first scientific experiments using a bell jar to provide a vacuum were reported by Robert Boyle. In his book, New Experiments Physico-Mechanicall, Touching the Spring of the Air, and its Effects, (Made, for the Most Part, in a New Pneumatical Engine), he described 43 separate experiments, some of which were carried out with Robert Hooke, investigating the effect of reducing the air pressure within the bell jar on the objects contained within.

=== Sound propagation experiments ===
One of the best known of these experiments involved placing a ringing bell inside the jar, and observing that upon pumping out the air, the ringing disappeared. This experiment demonstrated that the propagation of sound is mediated by the air, and that in the absence of the air medium, the sound waves cannot travel. This experiment is often used as a classroom science experiment, where the experiment is repeated with an item such as an alarm clock placed under a bell jar, and the noise of the alarm clock fading as the air is pumped out being used to demonstrate the effect. By additionally placing a microphone inside the bell jar and observing that the sound detected by the microphone reduces as the air is pumped out, the effect of absorbance of the sound by the glass of the jar itself can be excluded.

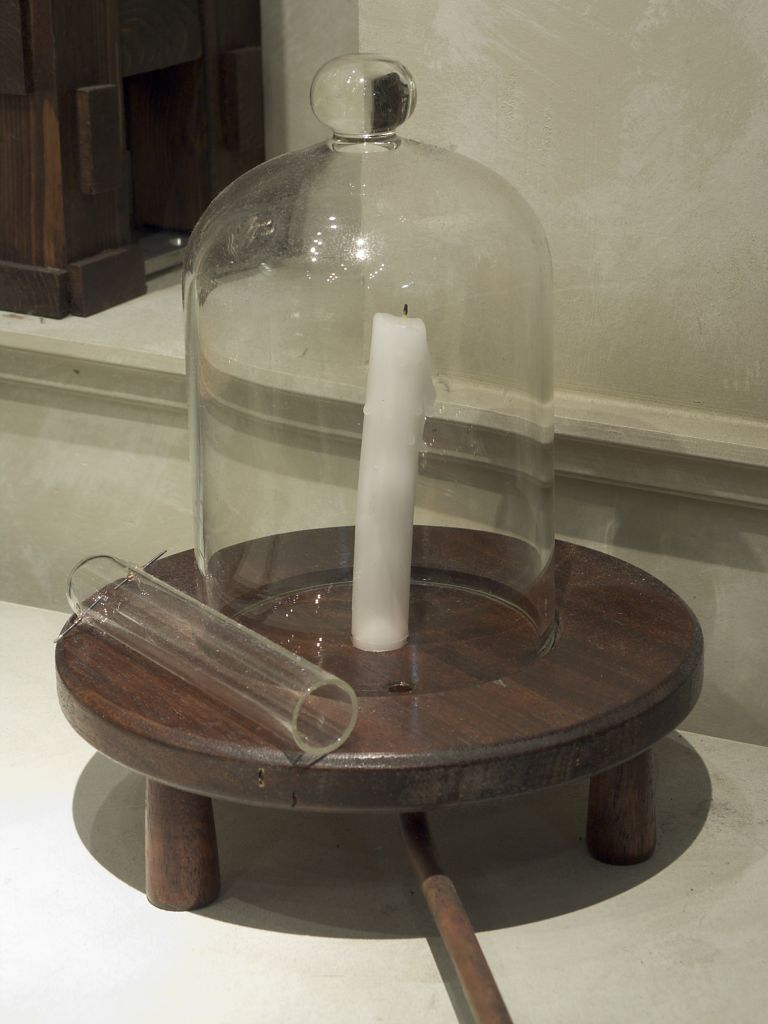
A model of Joseph Priestley's bell jar containing a candle

=== Candle in a bell jar experiments ===
Another common experiment using a bell jar involves placing a jar over a lit candle, and observing that the flame goes out, demonstrating that oxygen is required for combustion. A common variation of this experiment is to place the candle and bell jar over water, and to observe that when the candle extinguishes, the water level will rise inside the bell jar. The explanation for this observation is that the heating of the air inside the jar by the candles causes it to expand, and when the candle has exhausted the oxygen supply and extinguishes, the air will cool and contract, leading to the water being drawn up to fill the space. A common misconception is that the water level rises to replace the consumed oxygen, but since the combustion reaction produces carbon dioxide gas as a product, this explanation is not correct.

Joseph Priestley also used a candle and a mint plant placed beneath a bell jar in an experiment reported in Experiments and Observations on Different Kinds of Air to demonstrate the effect of photosynthesis. The candle was initially lit, and then the bell jar placed over the two items, and once the oxygen had been consumed by the candle, the flame extinguished. However, the candle was able to be reignited a number of days later, demonstrating that the plant had produced the oxygen required.

=== Physiological experiments ===
Priestley also carried out experiments using plants and mice beneath a bell jar. He found that whilst a mouse kept alone inside a bell jar eventually died, when a plant was also placed inside the jar the mouse would survive.

Boyle also studied the effect of removing the air from bell jars containing a number of different animals including insects, mice, birds and fish and observed how they reacted when the air was removed. In "Experiment 40", from New Experiments Physico-Mechanicall, Touching the Spring of the Air, and its Effects, (Made, for the Most Part, in a New Pneumatical Engine) he tested the ability of insects to fly under reduced air pressure, whilst in "Experiment 41," he demonstrated the reliance of living creatures on air for their survival.

The oil painting An Experiment on a Bird in the Air Pump depicts a natural philosopher repeating a similar experiment to that of Boyle with a bird inside a bell jar.

=== Risks ===
A vacuum produces a pressure difference of one atmosphere, approximately 14 psi, over the surface of the glass. The energy contained within an implosion is defined by the pressure difference and the volume evacuated. Flask volumes can change by orders of magnitude between experiments. Whenever working with liter sized or larger flasks, chemists should consider using a safety screen or the sash of a flow hood to protect them from shards of glass, should an implosion occur. Glassware can also be wrapped with spirals of tape to catch shards, or wrapped with webbed mesh more commonly seen on scuba cylinders.

Glass under vacuum becomes more sensitive to chips and scratches in its surface, as these form stress risers, so older glass is best avoided if possible. Impacts to the glass and thermally induced stresses are also concerns under vacuum. Round bottom flasks more effectively spread the stress across their surfaces, and are therefore safer when working under vacuum.

== Decorative or preservative ==
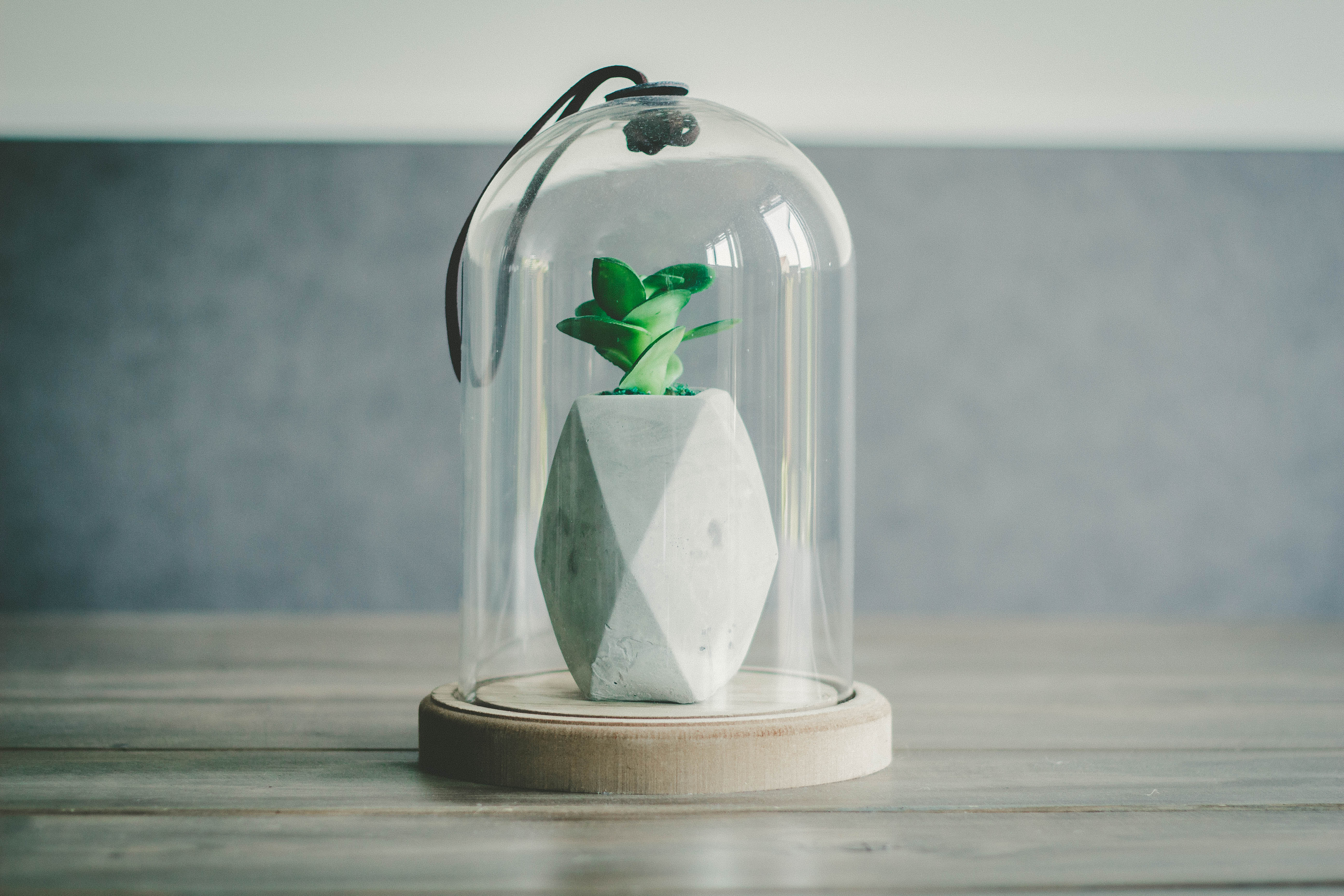
A modern-day decorative glass bell jar containing a succulent

Purely decorative bell jars were commonly used in the Victorian period to display and serve as transparent dust covers and display cases for a wide variety of items, including clocks, taxidermy, shells, and wax flowers and fruit. Decorative bell jars were made of thin glass, with more care being taken regarding their optical clarity, and they did not have a thickened base flange. For this reason, they are not suitable for vacuum use and would usually fail if pumped down.

Similar glass domes were used as cheese domes or cakebells.

== In popular culture ==
- "The Jar" (November 1944) is a short story by Ray Bradbury, published in Weird Fiction
- Under a Glass Bell (1944) is a short story collection by Anaïs Nin
- The Bell Jar (1963) is a roman à clef by Sylvia Plath, originally published under the pen name "Victoria Lucas"

== See also ==
- Cloche (agriculture) – Covering protecting plants from cold
- Desiccator – Sealable enclosures containing desiccants to preserve moisture-sensitive items
- Pet tree – Keyring or mobile phone accessory
- Vacuum evaporation – Causing boiling at lower temperature via lower pressure
