= Polytunnel =

Type of greenhouse

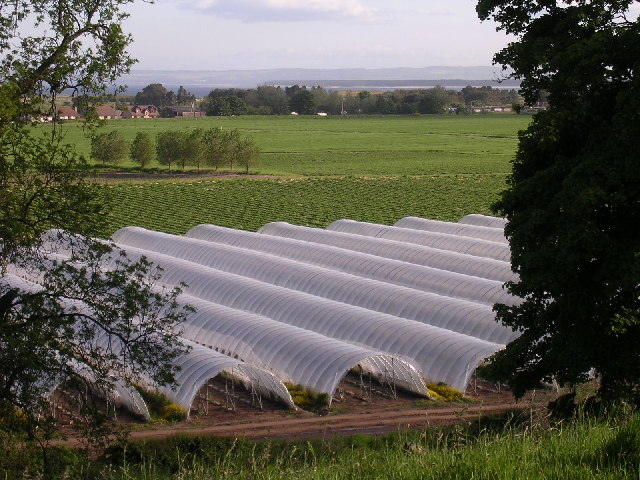
Polytunnels on Balhungie Farm, Angus

A polytunnel (also known as a polyhouse, hoop greenhouse, or hoophouse, grow tunnel or high tunnel) is a tunnel typically made from steel and covered in polyethylene, usually semi-circular, square or elongated in shape. The interior heats up because incoming solar radiation from the sun warms plants, soil, and other things inside the building faster than heat can escape the structure. Air warmed by the heat from hot interior surfaces is retained in the building by the roof and wall. Temperature, humidity, and ventilation can be controlled by equipment fixed in the polytunnel or by manual opening and closing of vents. Polytunnels are mainly used in temperate regions in similar ways to glass greenhouses and row covers. Besides the passive solar heating that every polytunnel provides, every variation of auxiliary heating (from hothouse heating through minimal heating to unheated houses) is represented in current practice. The nesting of row covers and low tunnels inside high tunnels is also common.

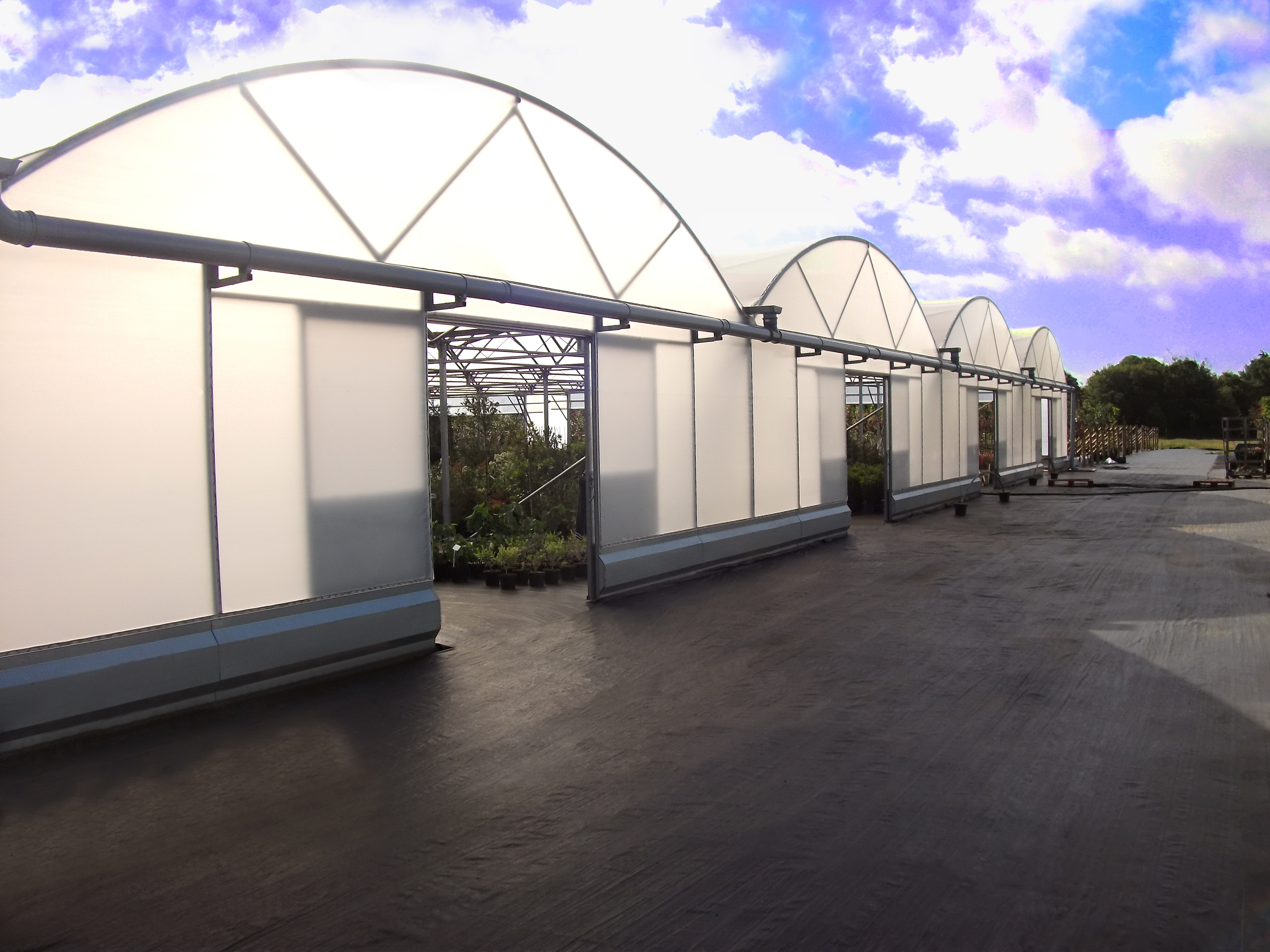
Superbay Polytunnel at Van Arnham Nurseries

Polytunnels can be used to provide a higher temperature and/or humidity than that which is available in the environment but can also protect crops from intense heat, bright sunlight, winds, hailstones, and cold waves. This allows fruits and vegetables to be grown at times usually considered off season; market gardeners commonly use polytunnels for season extension. Beyond season extension, polytunnels are also used to allow cold-hardy crops to overwinter in regions where their hardiness is not quite strong enough for them to survive outdoors. Temperature increases of only 5 to 15 °C (9 to 27 °F) above outdoor ambient, coupled with protection from the drying effect of wind, are enough to let selected plant varieties grow slowly but healthily instead of dying. The effect is to create a microclimate that simulates the temperatures of a location several hardiness zones closer to the equator (and protects from wind as well).

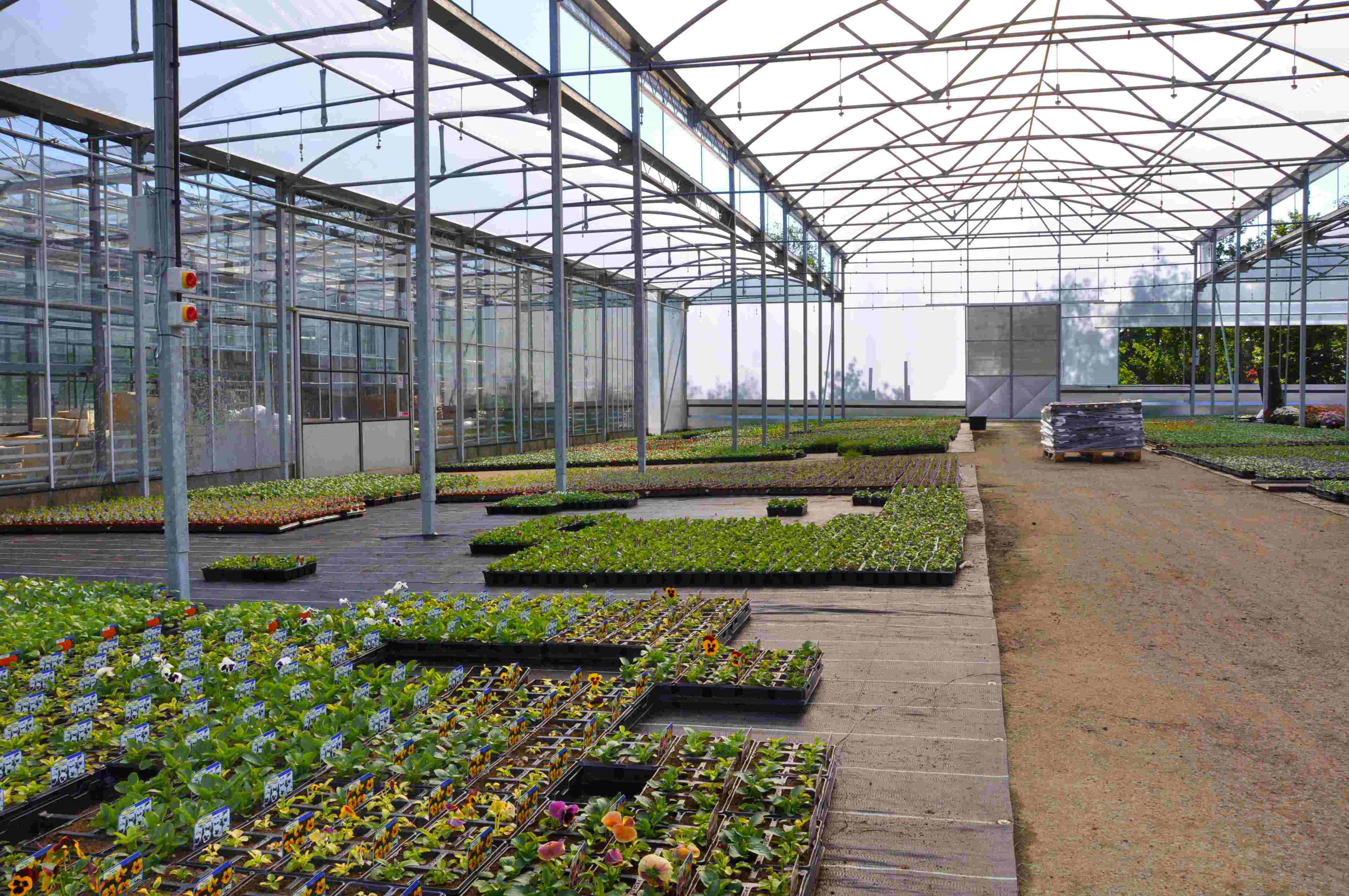
Superbay Polytunnel – Otter Nurseries

Every factor influencing a crop can be controlled in a polytunnel. Polytunnels are often used in strawberry, floriculture and plant nurseries, as the revenue value of the plants can justify the expense.

In recent years the true adaptability of polytunnel structures has been realised by adapting them to suit livestock housing. It is now commonplace in the UK to see polytunnels used for housing sheep, alpacas, goats, calves and poultry.

== Usage ==
=== Temperate regions ===
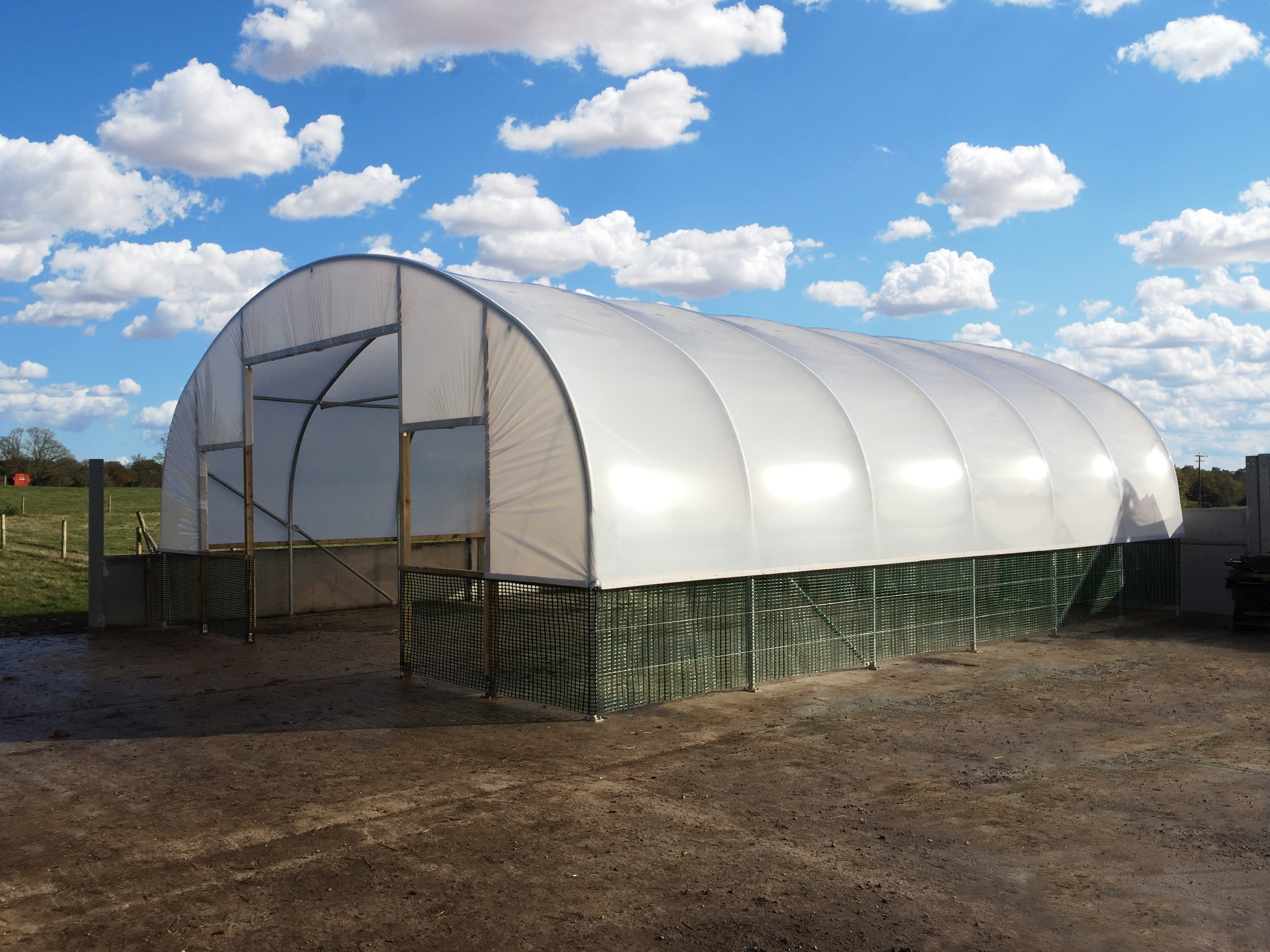
FlockMaster Livestock Polytunnel – Church Farm

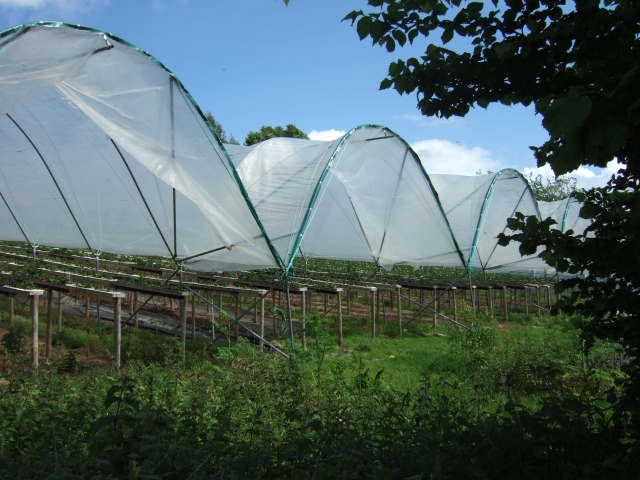
Spanish Fruit Tunnels

Polytunnels are mainly used in temperate regions in similar ways to greenhouses and cloches (row covers). Modern designs allow sowing and harvesting machines to move inside the structures, automating production. Polytunnels have had a significant effect on the production of strawberries in the United Kingdom. Other soft fruits such as raspberries and blackberries are also cultivated in the same way. In colder regions such as Quebec, Canada, they extend the growing season by 2-3 months. Also, local manufacturing such as Industries Harnois are now producing high tunnels locally in North America.

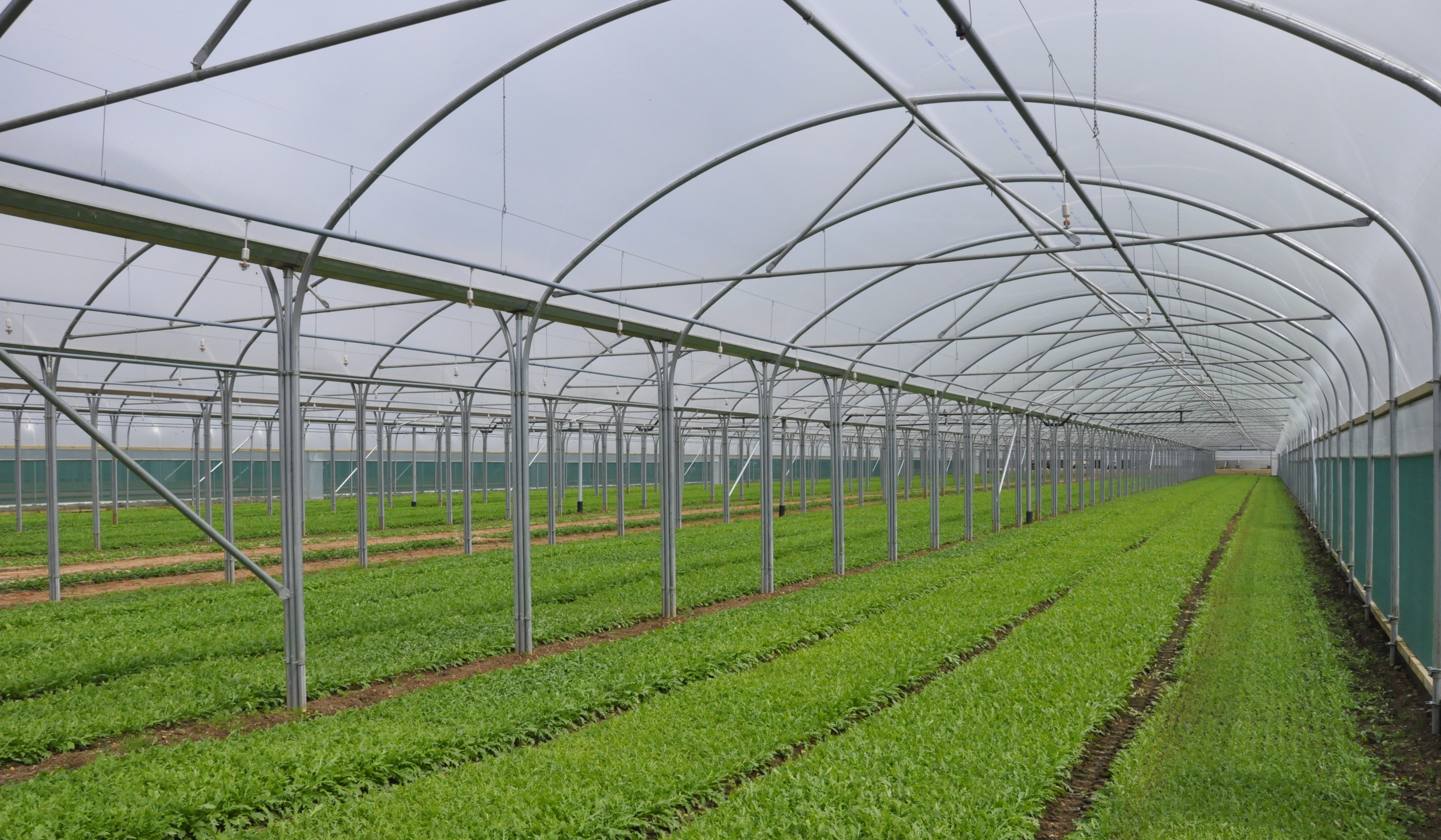
Multi-Span Polytunnel – Evesham

=== Tropical regions ===
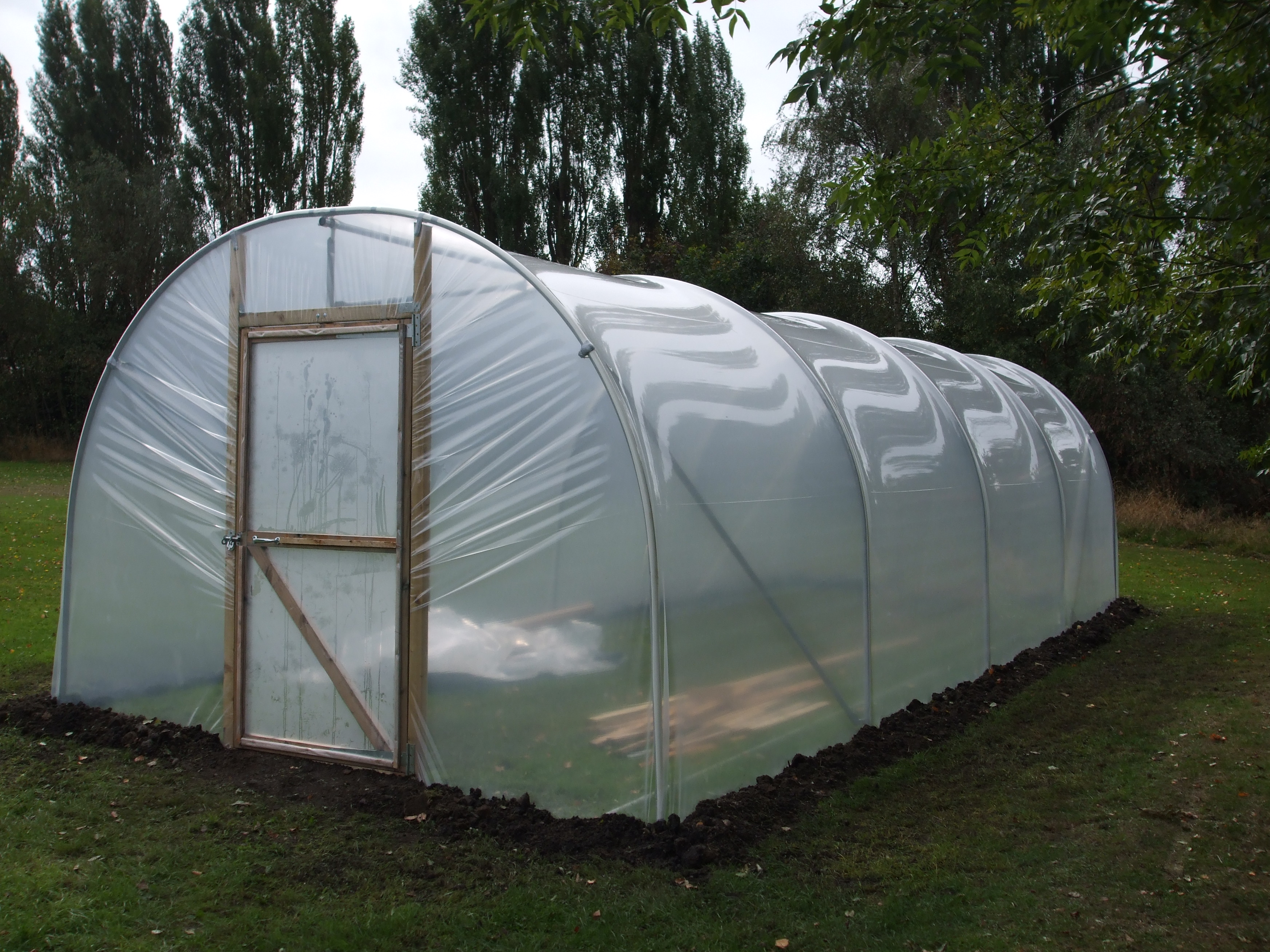
Hobby Polytunnel

In a tropical climate, temperatures are prone to soar above all normal levels. In such cases, foggers/misters are used to reduce the temperature. This does not increase the humidity levels in the polytunnel as the evaporated droplets are almost immediately ventilated to open air.

High-tech poly houses even have space-heating systems as well as soil-heating systems to purify the soil of unwanted viruses, bacteria, and other organisms. The recent Indo-Israel collaboration at Gharunda, near Karnal in India, is an excellent example of polyhouse farming taking place in a developing country. Christine Allen, of CAFOD, describes areas of Kenya where there are "vegetable-filled polytunnels as far as the eye can see", but notes that they primarily serve the export market rather than providing food for domestic consumption.

If developing countries were to develop a special incentive program solely for fruit-and-vegetable farmers, especially in demographically large nations like India, then the migration rate from rural to urban areas (as well as the loss of horticultural and fruit/vegetable farmers) to urban areas may be reduced. This brings a huge potential to improve the farming sector, which is key to long-term economic stability. The small polytunnels used by each farmer in each village promote the cultivation of vegetables both on-season and off-season, and would actually help to moderate the market rate for fruit and vegetables in long run, on a year-round basis, and would help to satisfy local market needs.

For example, in India, the inability to grow tomatoes generates price spikes during the monsoon season. This is seen as an ideal time to grow tomatoes in polytunnels, since they provide the ideal climate for the crop. In India, the Abhinav Farmers Club grows flowers and organic vegetables in polytunnels.

== Development ==
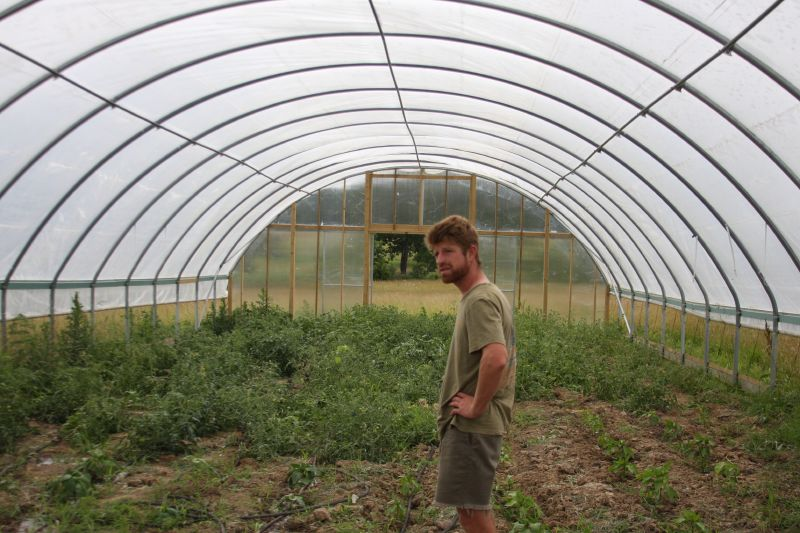
A Missouri farmer inspecting an early tomato crop in a hoop house.

Hoophouses have existed at least since the 1940s, but they are much more commonly used with each passing decade, and their design continues to evolve. Because of the wide variety of constantly changing designs, in reality there is an entirely continuous spectrum from high tunnels through low tunnels to the simplest row covers, although they are often thought about as discrete steps. Major themes of continuing development are (1) achieving the same results with lighter construction and less cost and (2) making hoophouses easily movable. The advantages of mobile hoophouses include greater return on investment (with the same unit of investment getting greater use per year across different crops in different months) and more flexibility on crop rotation without ever having to bother to dig the soil out of a stationary house (or use soil steam sterilization) to cure greenhouse soil sickness.

A US Department of Agriculture program is helping farmers install polytunnels. The program was announced at the US White House garden in December 2009.

Farmers in Iraq are building these in increasing number and adding drip irrigation to grow tomatoes.
