= Horticultural fleece =

Polypropylene fabric

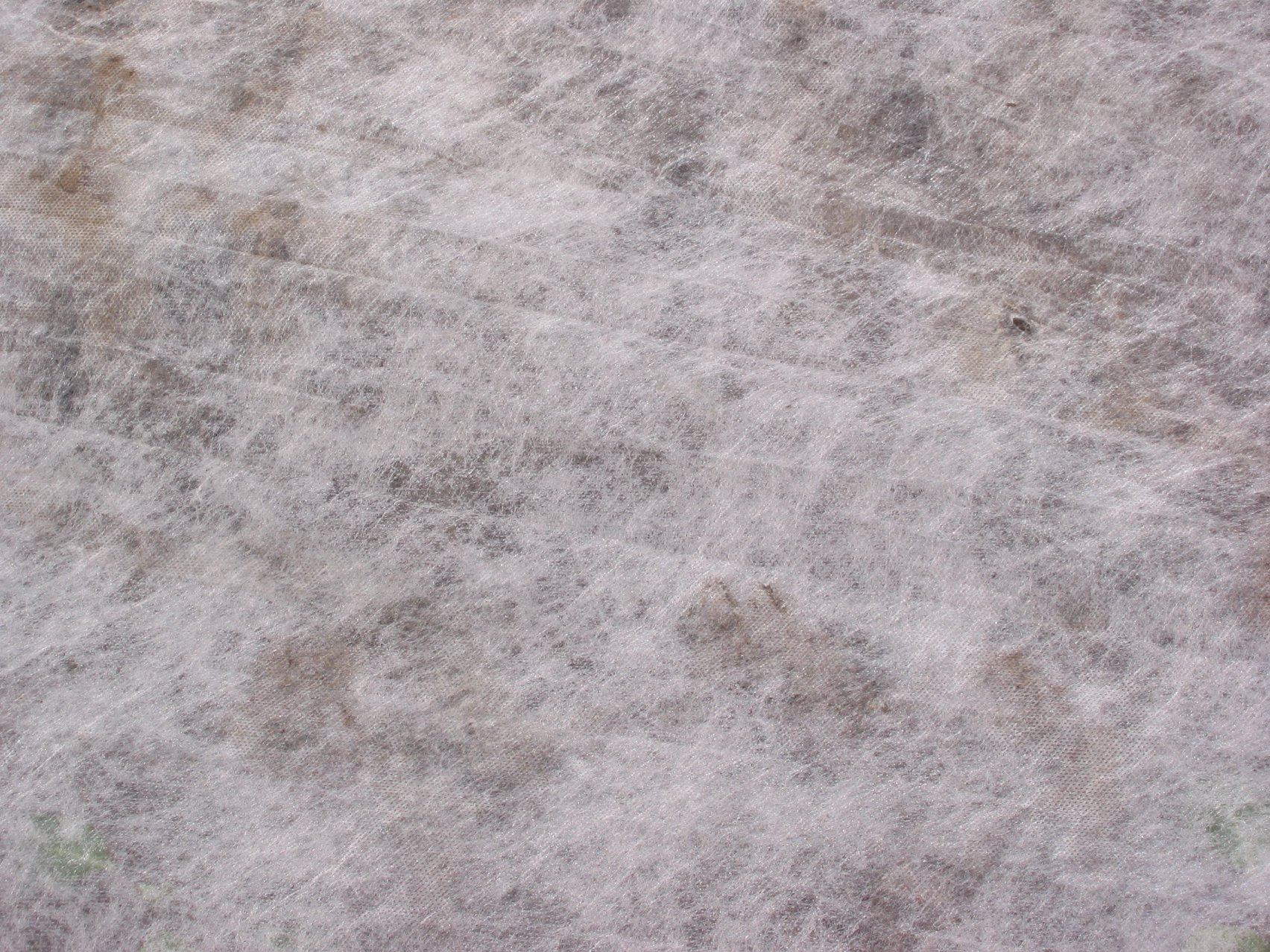

Horticultural fleece is a thin, nonwoven, polypropylene fabric which is used as a floating mulch to protect both late and early crops and delicate plants from cold weather and frost, as well as insect pests during the normal growing season. It admits light, air, and rain but creates a microclimate around the developing plants, allowing them to grow faster than the unprotected crops.

== Methods of use ==
Available in rolls of various widths, the fleece is laid across sown seedbeds or on the top of juvenile plants. If fleece covers rows, it is known as a kind of row cover. The edges may be secured with pegs, soil bags, or other weights if the site is small or not too exposed to winds, or buried in slit trenches. It will stretch slightly in use, which allows the plants to grow. For taller plants grown in rows or blocks, heavy-duty fleece can be used to fashion a form of "cloche", i.e. a small tent structure. When used as a protection against the wind the fleece is wrapped around, or covered over the delicate plants to protect them from frost and cold wind.

== Uses ==
- Extending the growing season for vegetables by allowing earlier sowings in spring and later cropping in autumn
- Hardening-off seedlings before transplanting them
- Protecting winter crops, allowing them to produce softer, more palatable growth than unprotected plants
- Providing extra warmth for crops of borderline hardiness
- Winter protection for ornamental plants and fruit blossom
- Protection from pests such as pigeons, rabbits, carrot fly, small white and large white butterflies, etc. flea beetles, cabbage loopers, and many other common garden pests.
