= Cloche (agriculture) =

Covering protecting plants from cold

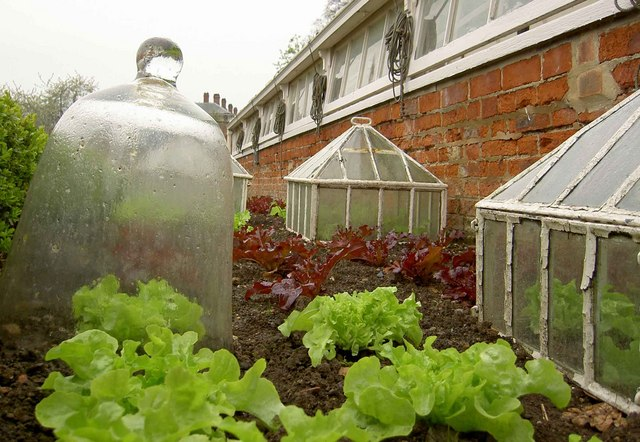
A traditional glass bell-shaped cloche on left, mini-greenhouse style on right

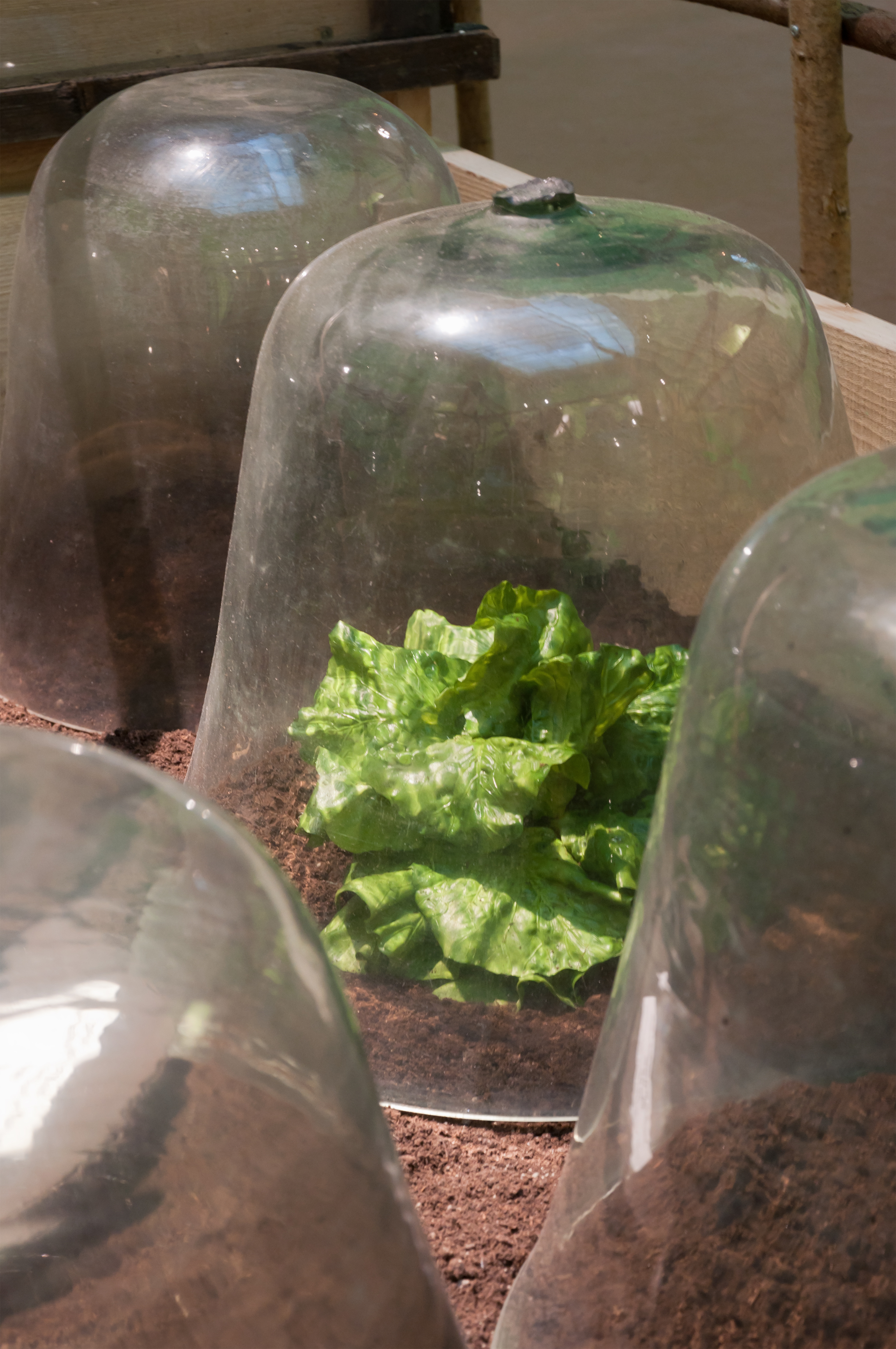
Lettuce under cloche

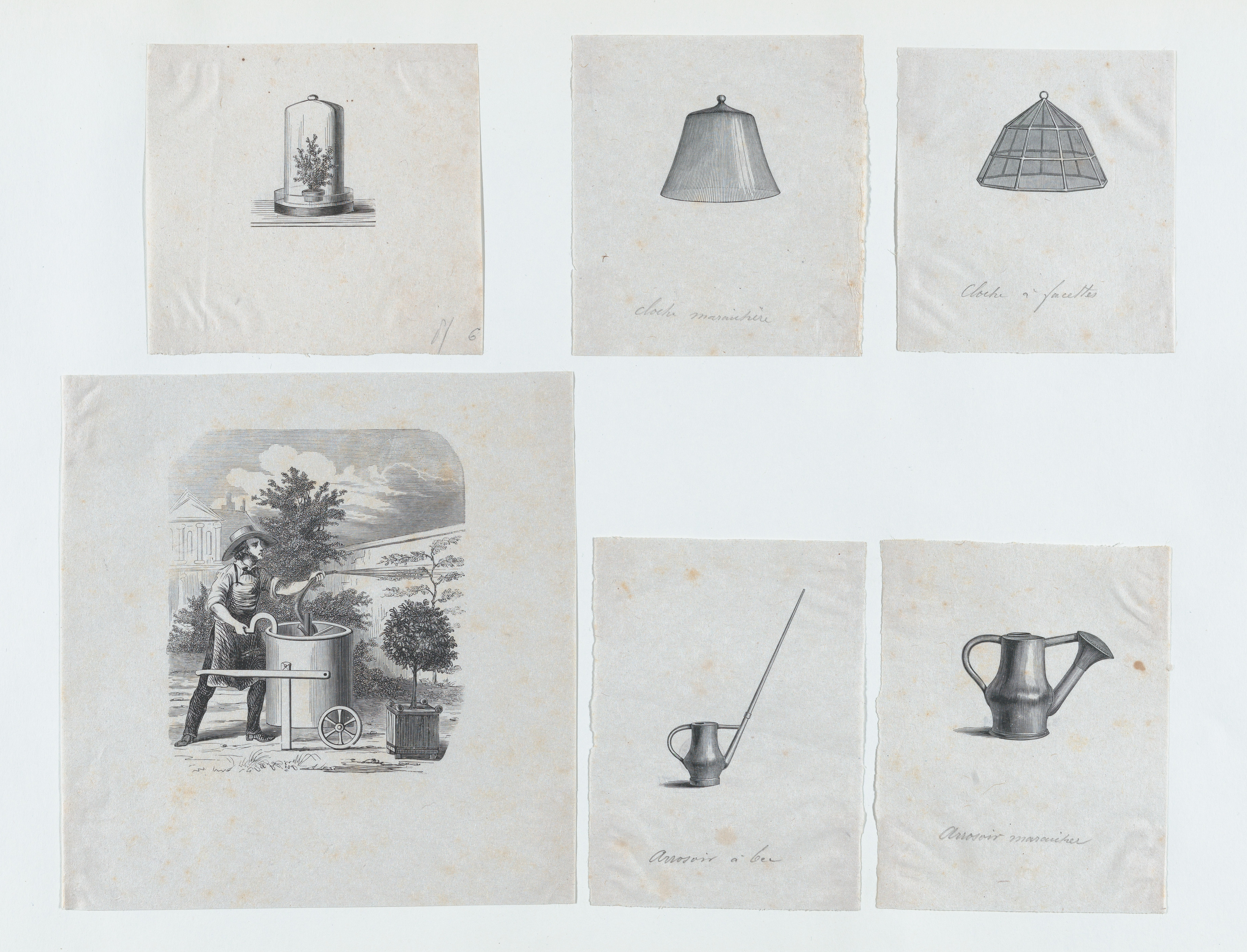
several styles of cloches

In agriculture and gardening, a cloche (from French, cloche for "bell") is a covering for protecting plants from cold temperatures. The original form of a cloche is a bell-shaped glass cover that is placed over an individual plant; modern cloches are usually made from plastic. The use of cloches is traced back to market gardens in 19th century France, where entire fields of plants would be protected with cloches. In commercial growing, cloches have largely been replaced by row cover, and nowadays are mainly found in smaller gardens.

== History ==
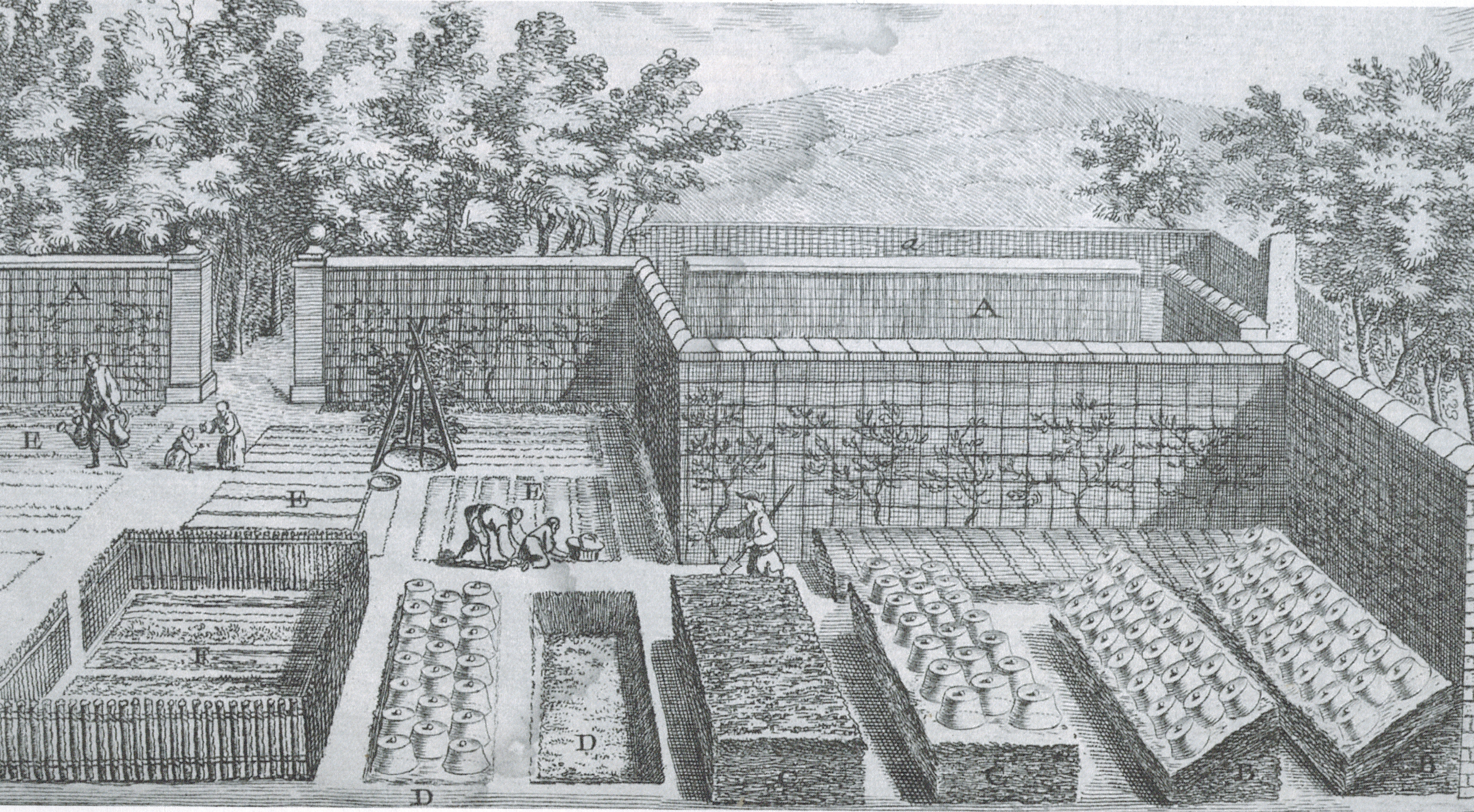
17th century garden showing rows of cloches

Parisian market gardens in the 1800s used 18-inch diameter bell-shaped glass jars (cloches) to protect plants in cold weather. They were used to protect everything from young seedlings to mature plants. Notched wooden sticks were used to prop up and vent the jars on sunny days, and were placed back down on the soil before nightfall.

"Chase barn cloches", introduced in the early twentieth century by Major L.H. Chase, are constructed with flat panes of glass and held together by wires. They can be connected together to make a long row. They were vulnerable to falling shrapnel in World War II England. This style is still in use today where the wire assembly pieces are purchased as a kit and you use generic glass pieces.

== See also ==
- Bell jar – Glass jar used in scientific experiments
- Season extension – Crop growing method
