= Ultrasonic hydroponic fogger =

In a hydroponic system ultrasonic hydroponic foggers are used to create a fine mist, the individual particle size of which is typically of about 5 μm in diameter. These fine particles are capable of carrying nutrients from the standing water of a reservoir to plant roots. Benefits include humidification and exponentially improved root exposure to oxygen.

Ultrasonic hydroponic foggers can be used in conjunction with prior advances such as aeroponic misters or even ebb and flow systems to help improve humidity levels (mimicking a rainforest canopy) and increase nutrient absorption, thus boosting growth rates. Research into standalone fogger-supported hydroponic growing is underway.
