= Greenhouse =

Building for growing plants

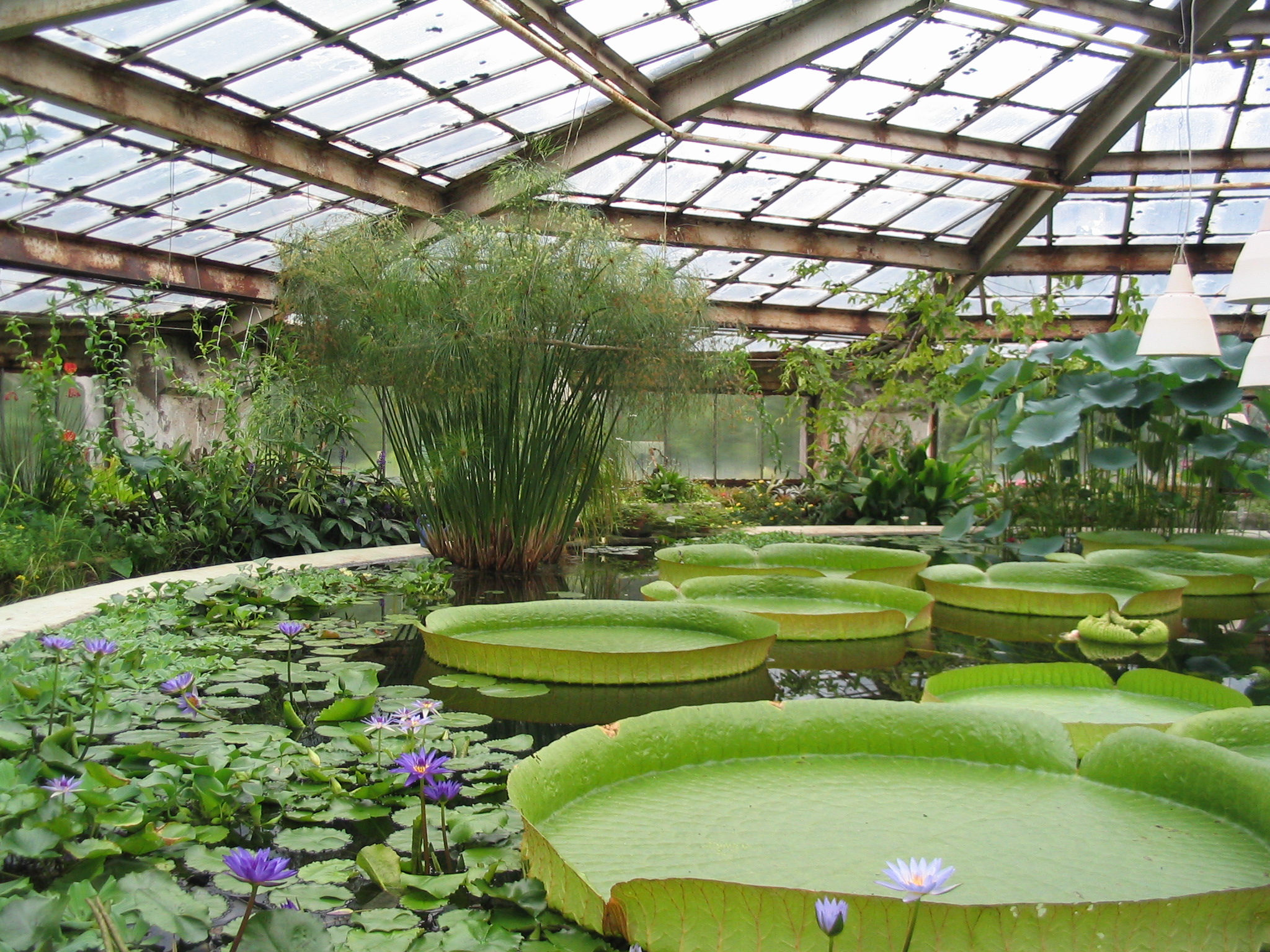
Victoria amazonica (giant Amazon waterlilies) in a large greenhouse at the Saint Petersburg Botanical Garden

In horticulture, a greenhouse is a structure designed to regulate the temperature and humidity of the environment inside it with a view to growing plants. There are different types of greenhouses, but they all have large areas covered with transparent materials that let sunlight enter and that inhibit the loss of the sun's heat. The most common materials used in modern greenhouses for walls and roofs are rigid plastics made of polycarbonate, plastic film made of polyethylene, or glass panes. When sunlight shines into a greenhouse the temperature inside increases, providing a sheltered environment for plants to grow — even in cold weather.

The terms greenhouse, glasshouse, and hothouse often refer interchangeably to buildings used for cultivating plants. The specific term used depends on the material and on the heating-system used in the building. As of 2026, greenhouses are more commonly constructed with a variety of materials, such as wood and polyethylene plastic. A glasshouse, on the other hand, is a traditional type of greenhouse which uses glass panes that allow light to enter. The term hothouse indicates the use of artificial heating. However, both heated and unheated structures can generally class as greenhouses.

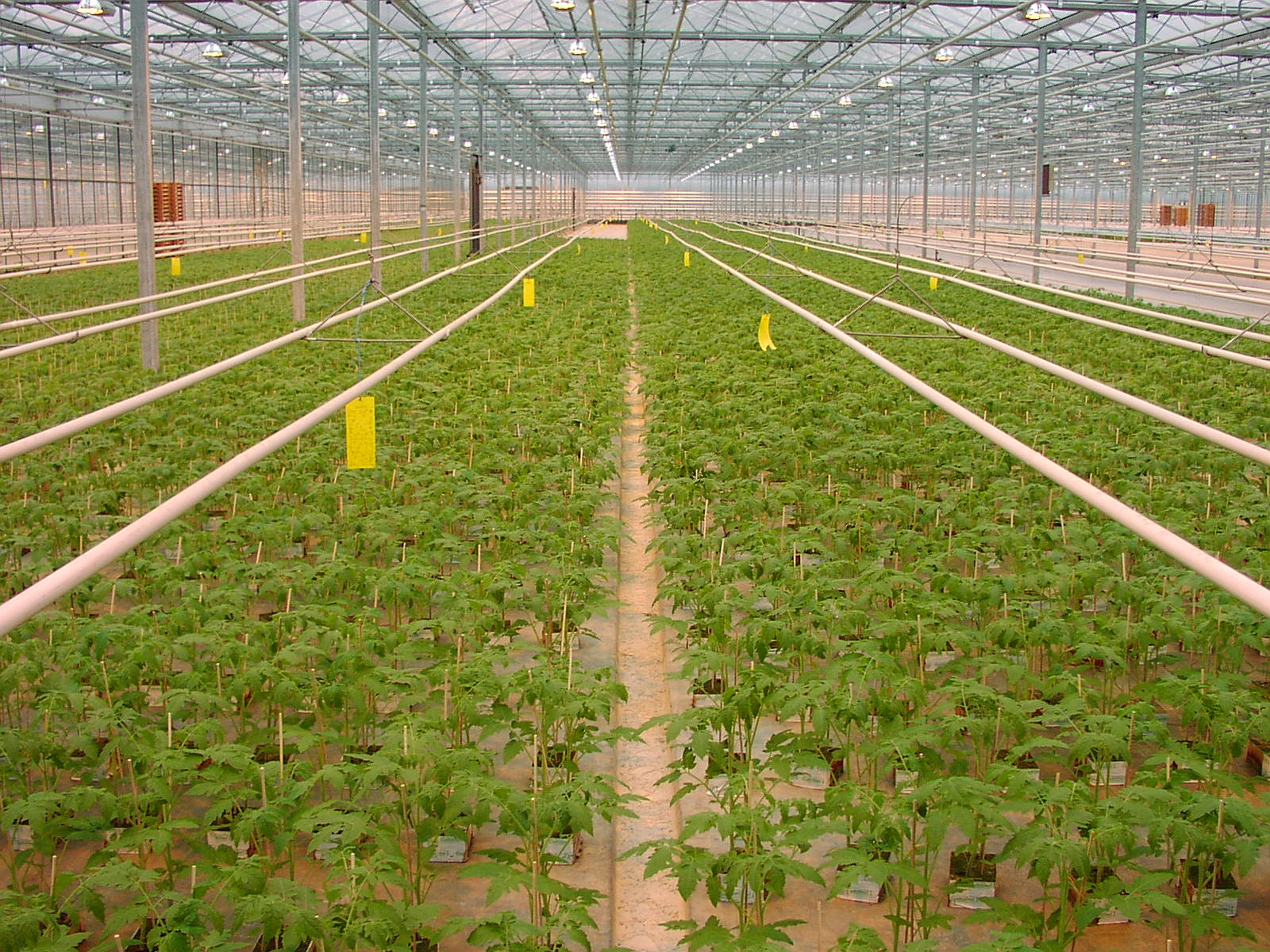
Young tomato plants for transplanting in an industrial-sized greenhouse in the Westland, Netherlands

The word "vinery", when referring to a site for growing grapevines, may reference either a hothouse or a glasshouse.

Greenhouses can range in size from small sheds to industrial-sized buildings and colossal glasshouses. The smallest example is a miniature greenhouse known as a cold frame, typically used at home (compare cloche). Large commercial greenhouses are high-tech production-facilities used to grow vegetables, flowers or fruits. Such glass greenhouses may feature extensive equipment, including screening, heating, cooling, and lighting installations, sometimes controlled by a computer to optimize conditions for plant growth. Different techniques manage growing conditions (including air temperature, relative humidity and vapour-pressure deficit) in order to provide the optimum environment for cultivation of a specific crop.

== History ==
=== Roman Empire ===
Before the development of greenhouses, agricultural practices were constrained to weather conditions. According to the climatic zone of communities, people were limited to a select range of species and time of the year in which they could grow plants. Yet around 30 CE, the Roman Empire built the first recorded attempt of an artificial environment. Due to emperor Tiberius's declining health, the royal physicians recommended that the emperor eat one cucumber a day. Cucumbers, however, are quite tender plants and do not grow easily year-round. Therefore, the Romans designed an artificial environment, like a greenhouse, to have cucumbers available for the emperor all year. Cucumbers were planted in wheeled carts which were put in the sun daily, then taken inside to keep them warm at night. The cucumbers were stored under frames or in cucumber houses glazed with either oiled cloth known as specularia or with sheets of selenite (a.k.a. lapis specularis), according to the description by Pliny the Elder.

=== 15th-century Korea ===
The next biggest breakthrough in greenhouse design came from Korea in the 15th century during the Joseon dynasty. In the 1450s, Soon ui Jeon described the first artificially heated greenhouse in his manuscript called Sangayorok. Soon ui Jeon was a physician to the royal family, and Sangayorok was intended to provide the nobility with important agricultural and housekeeping knowledge. Within the section of agricultural techniques, Soon ui Jeon wrote how to build a greenhouse that was able to cultivate vegetables and other plants in the winter. The Korean design adds an ondol system to the structure. An ondol is a Korean heating system used in domestic spaces, which runs a flue pipe from a heat source underneath the flooring. In addition to the ondol, a cauldron filled with water was also heated to create steam and increase the temperature and humidity in the greenhouse. These Korean greenhouses were the first active greenhouses that controlled temperature, rather than only relying on energy from the sun. The design still included passive heating methods, such as semi-transparent oiled hanji windows to capture light and cob walls to retain heat, but the furnace provided extra control over the artificial environment. The Annals of the Joseon Dynasty confirm that greenhouse-like structures incorporating ondol were constructed to provide heat for mandarin orange trees during the winter of 1438.

=== 17th century ===
The concept of greenhouses also appeared in the Netherlands and then England in the 17th century, along with the plants. Some of these early attempts required enormous amounts of work to close up at night or to winterize. There were serious problems with providing adequate and balanced heat in these early greenhouses. The first 'stove' (heated) greenhouse in the UK was completed at Chelsea Physic Garden by 1681. Today, the Netherlands has many of the largest greenhouses in the world, some of them so vast that they are able to produce millions of vegetables every year.

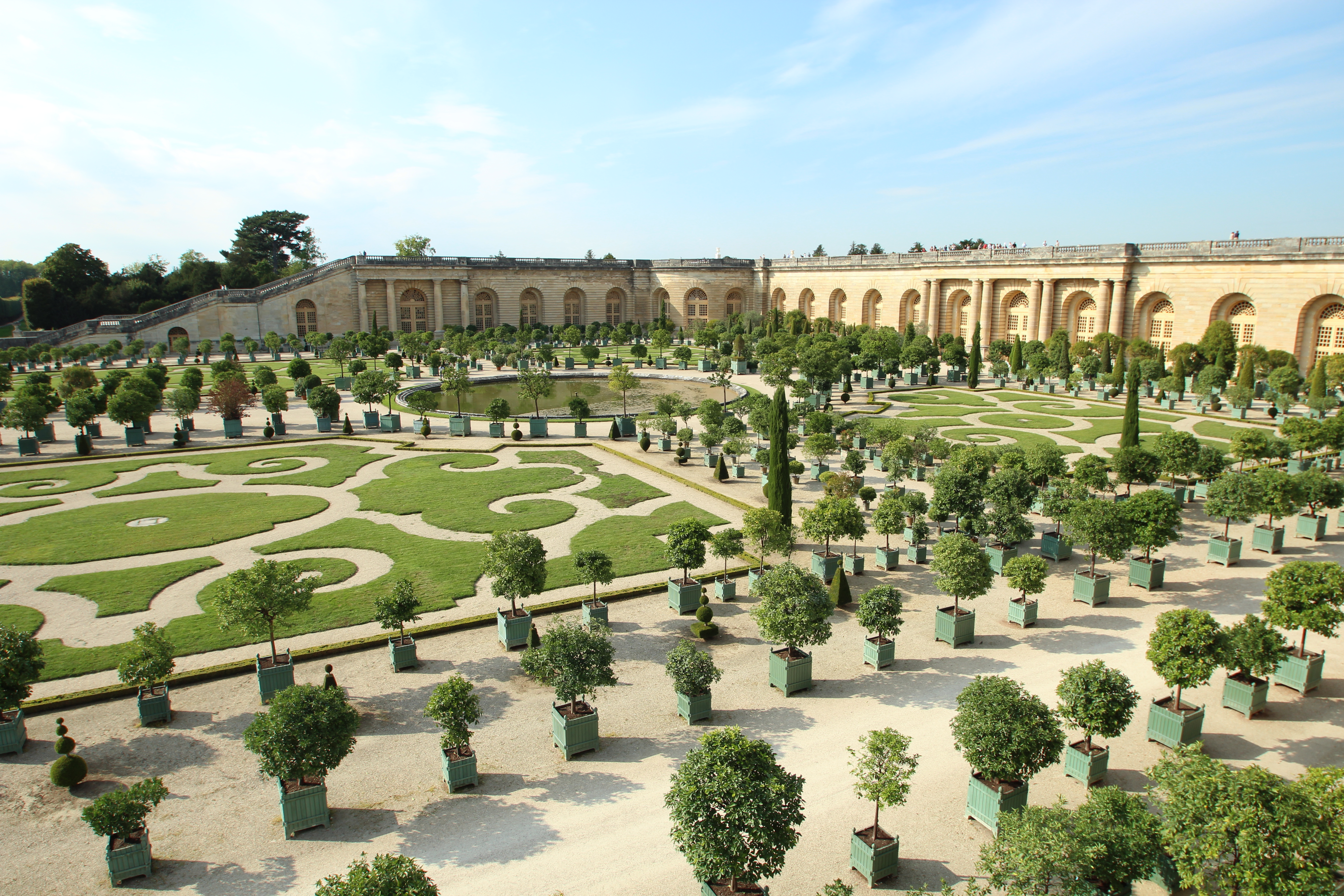
Versailles Orangerie at the Palace of Versailles, France.

Experimentation with greenhouse design continued during the 17th century in Europe, as technology produced better glass and construction techniques improved. The greenhouse at the Palace of Versailles was an example of their size and elaborateness; it was more than 150 metres (490 ft) long, 13 metres (43 ft) wide, and 14 metres (46 ft) high.

=== 18th century ===
Andrew Faneuil, a prosperous Boston merchant, built the first American greenhouse in 1737.

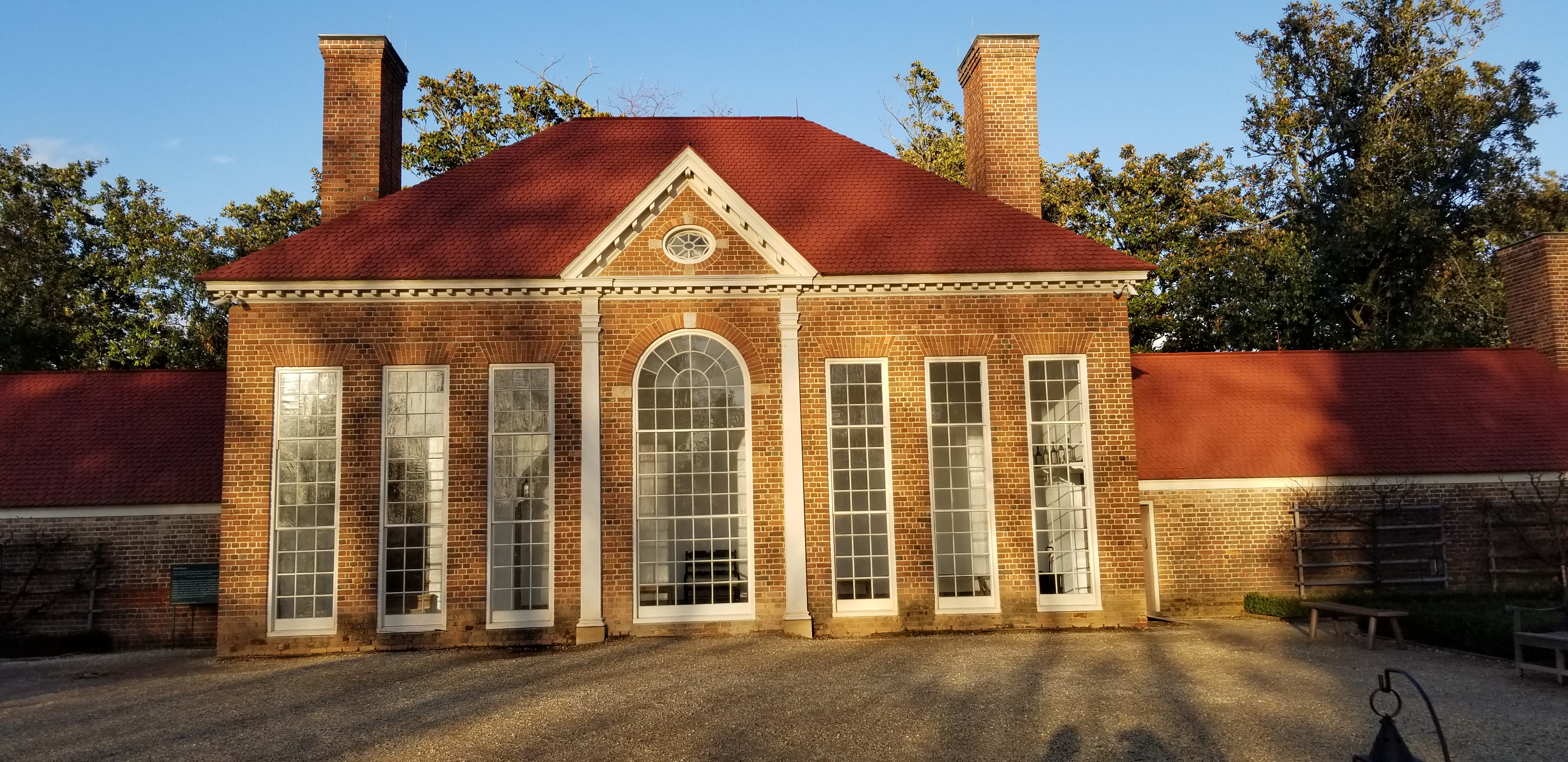
Reconstruction of George Washington's greenhouse at Mount Vernon

When returning to Mount Vernon after the war, George Washington learned of the greenhouse built at the Carroll estate of Mount Clare (Maryland). It was designed by Margaret Tilghman Carroll, an industrious gardener who cultivated citrus trees in this orangery. In 1784 Washington wrote requesting details about the design of her greenhouse, and she complied. Washington wrote:

I shall essay the finishing of my greenhouse this fall, but find that neither myself, nor any person about me is so well skilled in the internal constructions as to proceed without a probability at least of running into errors. Shall I for this reason, ask the favor of you to give me a short description of the Green-house at Mrs. Carrolls? I am persuaded, now that I planned mine on too contracted a scale. My house is (of Brick) 40 feet by 24, in the outer dimensions …

=== 19th century ===
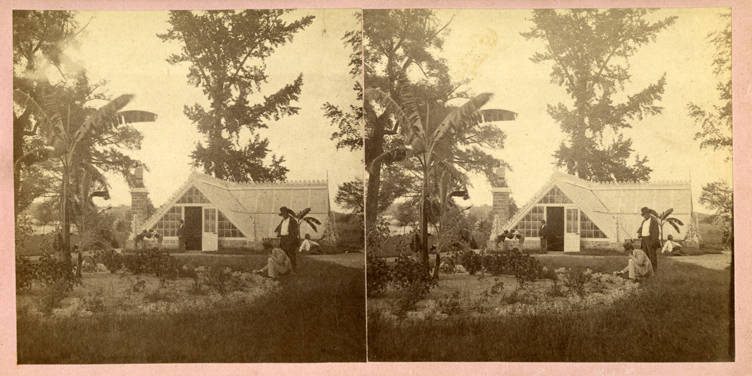
A heated greenhouse, or "hothouse", In Macon, Georgia c. 1877.

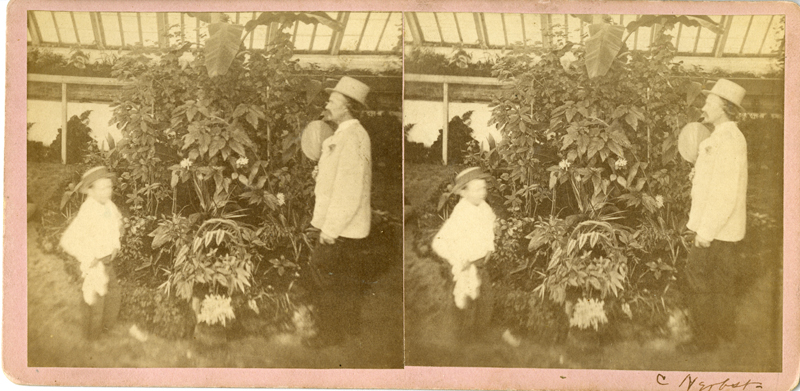
Interior of a "hothouse" (or greenhouse) in Central City Park, Macon, GA, c. 1877.

The French botanist Charles Lucien Bonaparte is often credited with building the first practical modern greenhouse in Leiden, Holland, during the 1800s to grow medicinal tropical plants. Originally only on the estates of the rich, the growth of the science of botany caused greenhouses to spread to the universities. The French called their first greenhouses orangeries, since they were used to protect orange trees from freezing. As pineapples became popular, pineries, or pineapple pits, were built.

=== 19th-century England ===
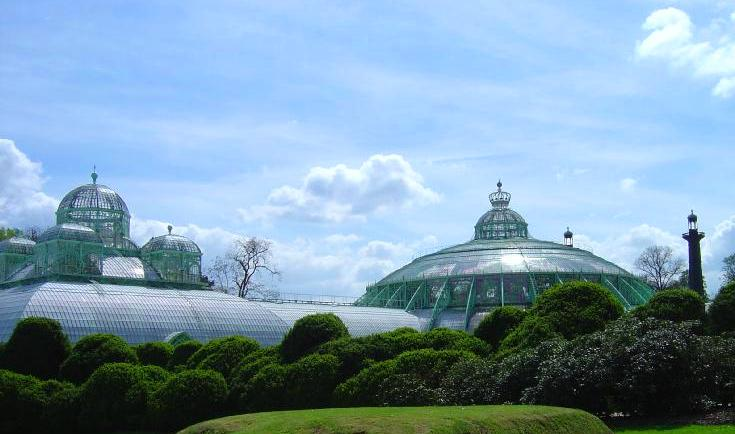
The Royal Greenhouses of Laeken, Brussels, Belgium, an example of 19th-century greenhouse architecture

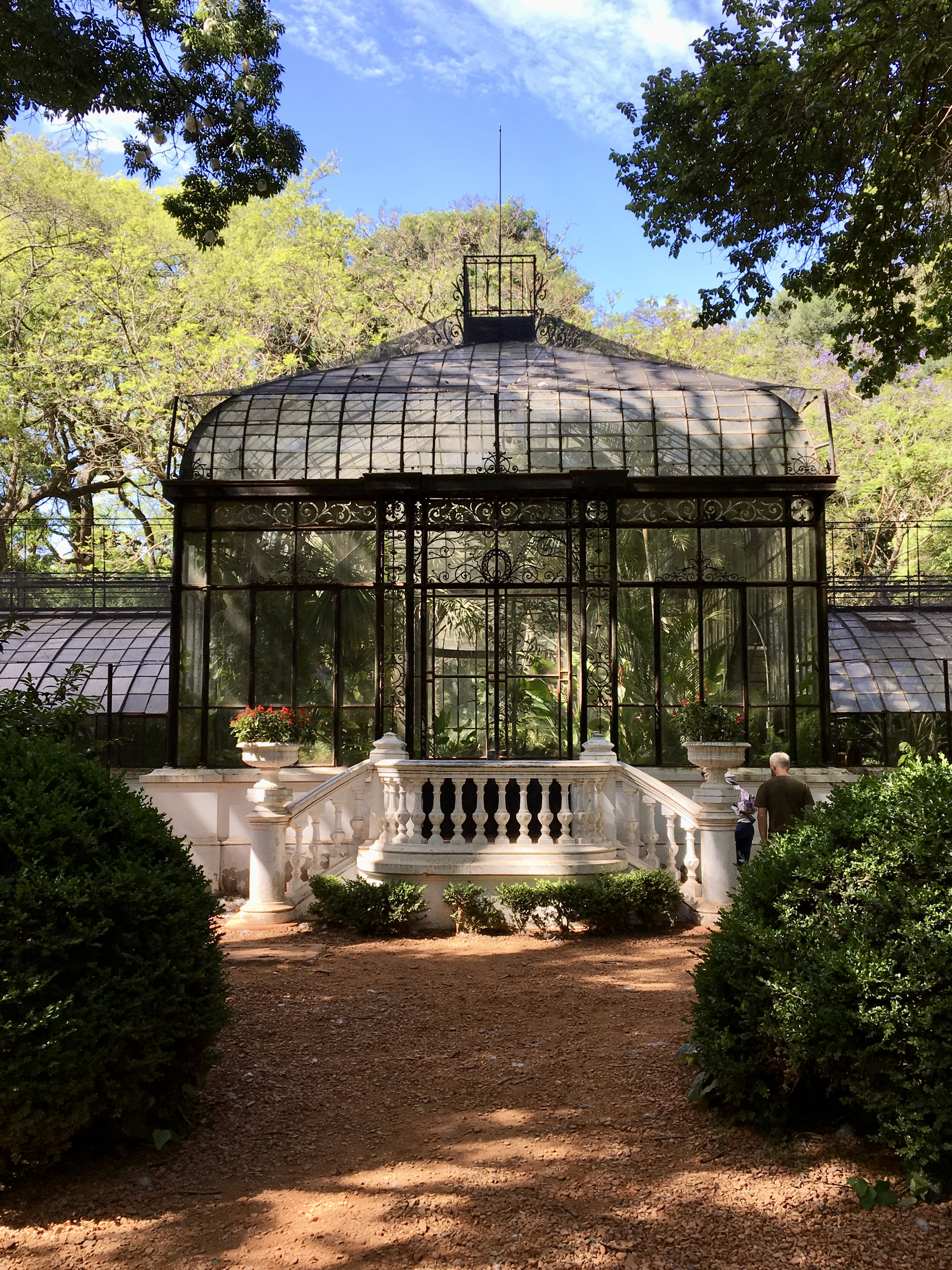
Main greenhouse in the Buenos Aires Botanical Garden

The largest glasshouses yet conceived were constructed in England during the Victorian era. As a direct result of colonial expansion, the purpose of glasshouses changed from agriculture to horticulture. The accelerated transfer of plants and horticultural knowledge between colonies contributed to the Victorian fascination with 'exotic' plants and environments. Glasshouses became spectacles to entertain the general public. The curated environments in glasshouses aimed to capture "the Western imagination of an idealised landscape" and support the fantasy of the cultural 'other'. As a consequence, the collection of plants are believed to be true reflections of the world, yet are actually stereotypical arrangements of 'exotic' plants to symbolize exactly where British colonies are and how far their authority reaches. To uphold British hegemony, glasshouses became arguments of colonial power which flaunt the "absolute control of colonized environments and flora...[using plants] as a symbol of British Imperial power.

A prominent design from the 19th century were glasshouses with sufficient height for sizeable trees, called palm houses. These were normally in public gardens or parks and exemplified the 19th-century development of glass and iron architecture. This technology was widely used in railway stations, markets, exhibition halls, and other large buildings that needed large, open internal area. One of the earliest examples of a palm house is in the Belfast Botanic Gardens. Designed by Charles Lanyon, the building was completed in 1840. It was constructed by iron-maker Richard Turner, who would later build the Palm House, Kew Gardens at the Royal Botanic Gardens, Kew, London, in 1848. This came shortly after the Chatsworth Great Conservatory (1837–40) and shortly before The Crystal Palace (1851), both designed by Joseph Paxton, and both now lost.

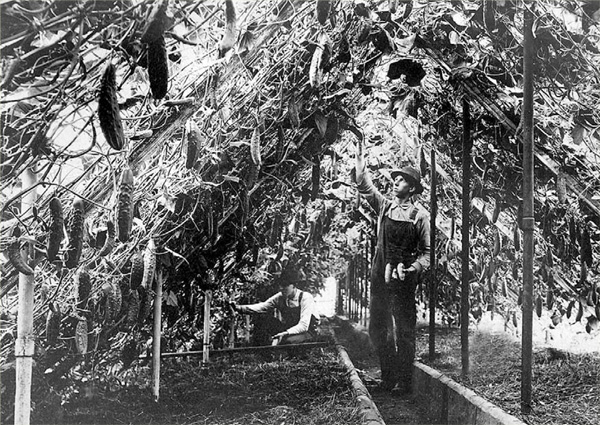
Cucumbers reached to the ceiling in a greenhouse in Richfield, Minnesota, where market gardeners grew a wide variety of produce for sale in Minneapolis, c. 1910

Other large greenhouses built in the 19th century included the New York Crystal Palace, Munich's Glaspalast and the Royal Greenhouses of Laeken (1874–1895) for King Leopold II of Belgium. In Japan, the first greenhouse was built in 1880 by Samuel Cocking, a British merchant who exported herbs.

=== 20th century ===
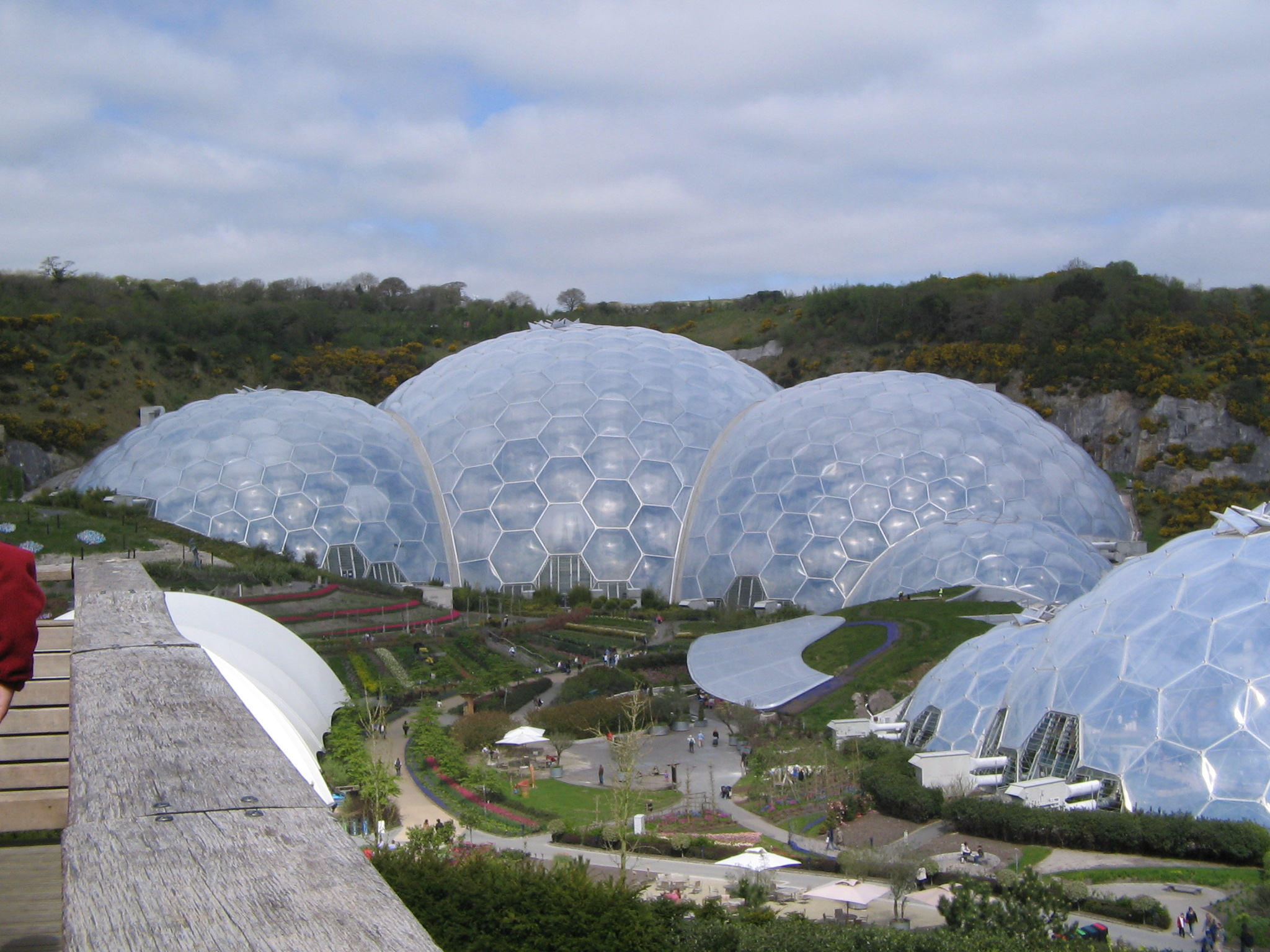
The Eden Project, in Cornwall, England

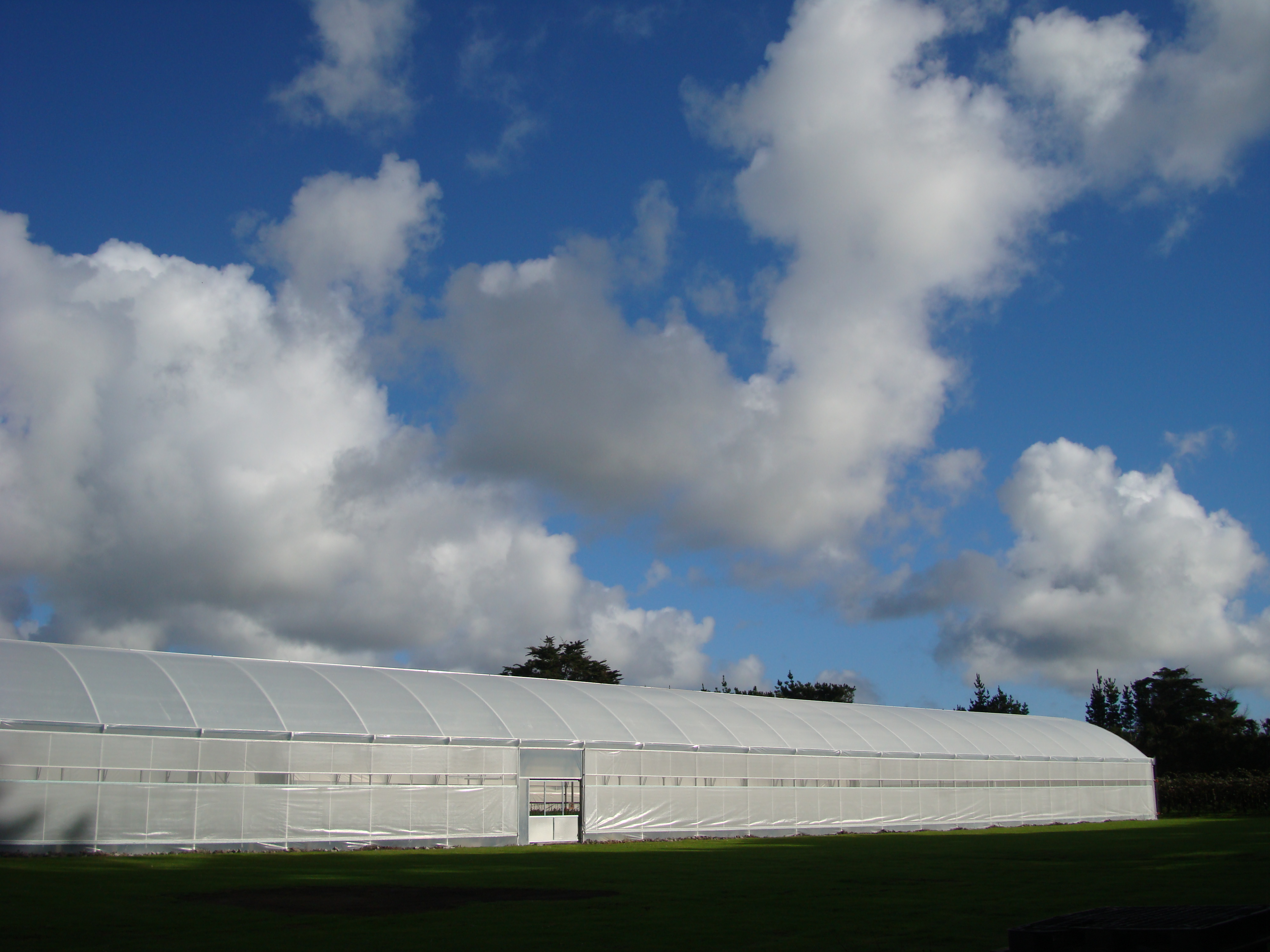
A plastic air-insulated greenhouse in New Zealand

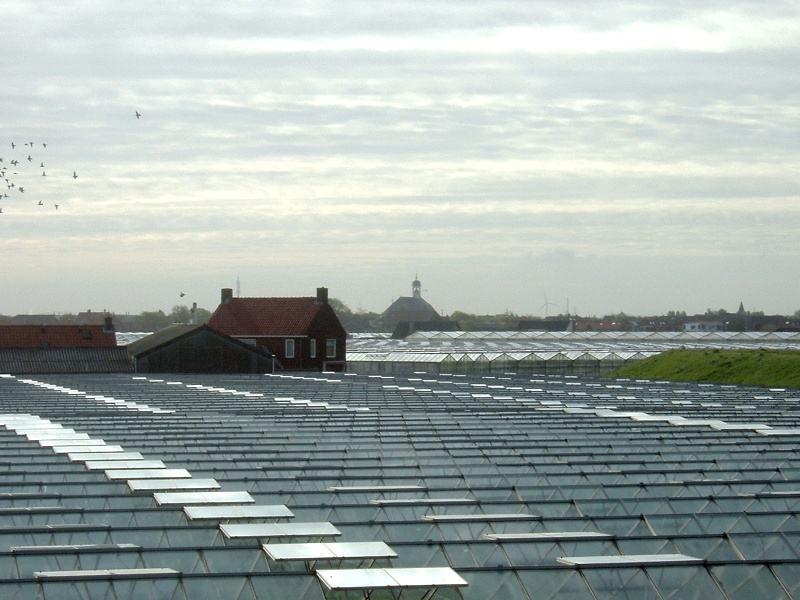
Giant greenhouses in Westland, the Netherlands

In the 20th century, the geodesic dome was added to the many types of greenhouses. Notable examples are the Eden Project in Cornwall, The Rodale Institute in Pennsylvania, the Climatron at the Missouri Botanical Garden in St. Louis, Missouri, and Toyota Motor Manufacturing Kentucky. The pyramid is another popular shape for large, high greenhouses; there are several pyramidal greenhouses at the Muttart Conservatory in Alberta (c. 1976).

Greenhouse structures adapted in the 1960s when wider sheets of polyethylene (polythene) film became widely available. Hoop houses were made by several companies and were also frequently made by the growers themselves. Constructed of aluminum extrusions, special galvanized steel tubing, or even just lengths of steel or PVC water pipe, construction costs were greatly reduced. This resulted in many more greenhouses being constructed on smaller farms and garden centers. Polyethylene film durability increased greatly when more effective UV-inhibitors were developed and added in the 1970s; these extended the usable life of the film from one or two years up to three and eventually four or more years.

Gutter-connected greenhouses became more prevalent in the 1980s and 1990s. These greenhouses have two or more bays connected by a common wall, or row of support posts. Heating inputs were reduced as the ratio of floor area to exterior wall area was increased substantially. Gutter-connected greenhouses are now commonly used both in production and in situations where plants are grown and sold to the public as well. Gutter-connected greenhouses are commonly covered with structured polycarbonate materials, or a double layer of polyethylene film with air blown between to provide increased heating efficiencies.

== Theory of operation ==
The warmer temperature in a greenhouse occurs because incident solar radiation passes through the transparent roof and walls and is absorbed by the floor, earth, and contents, which become warmer. These in turn warm up the surrounding air within the greenhouse. As the structure is not open to the atmosphere, the warmed air cannot escape via convection due to the presence of roof and walls, so the temperature inside the greenhouse rises.

Window glasses are practically transparent for short-wave infra-red radiation emitted by the sun, but almost opaque for long-wave radiation emitted by objects in the room.

Quantitative studies suggest that the effect of infrared radiative cooling is not negligibly small, and may have economic implications in a heated greenhouse. Analysis of issues of near-infrared radiation in a greenhouse with screens of a high coefficient of reflection concluded that installation of such screens reduced heat demand by about 8%, and application of dyes to transparent surfaces was suggested. Such as, using techniques that apply coatings which convert ultraviolet wavelengths into red light, improving photosynthetic efficiency and increasing crop yields. Composite less-reflective glass, or less effective but cheaper anti-reflective coated simple glass, also produced savings.

=== Ventilation ===
Ventilation is one of the most important components in a successful greenhouse. If there is no proper ventilation, greenhouses and their growing plants can become prone to problems. The main purposes of ventilation is to regulate the temperature and humidity to the optimal level, and to ensure movement of air and thus prevent the build-up of plant pathogens (such as Botrytis cinerea) that prefer still air conditions. Ventilation also ensures a supply of fresh air for photosynthesis and plant respiration, and may enable important pollinators to access the greenhouse crop.

Ventilation can be achieved via the use of vents – often controlled automatically via a computer – and recirculation fans.

=== Heating ===
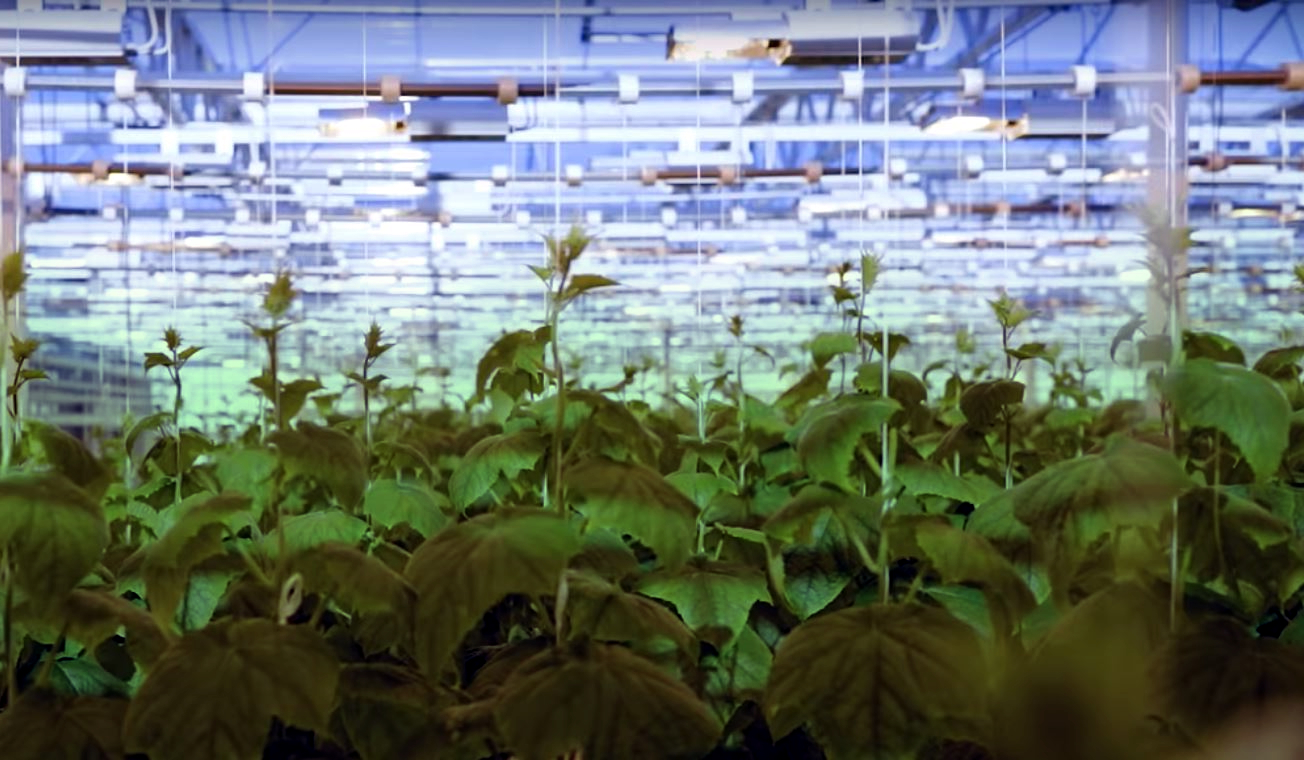
Thermal lights at a greenhouse in Närpes, Finland

Heating or electricity is one of the most considerable costs in the operation of greenhouses across the globe, especially in colder climates. The main problem with heating a greenhouse as opposed to a building that has solid opaque walls is the amount of heat lost through the greenhouse covering. Since the coverings need to allow light to filter into the structure, they conversely cannot insulate very well. With traditional plastic greenhouse coverings having an R-value of around 2, a great amount of money is therefore spent to continually replace the heat lost. Most greenhouses, when supplemental heat is needed use natural gas or electric furnaces.

Passive heating methods exist which seek heat using low energy input. Solar energy can be captured from periods of relative abundance (day time/summer), and released to boost the temperature during cooler periods (night time/winter). Waste heat from livestock can be used to heat greenhouses, e.g., placing a chicken coop inside a greenhouse recovers the heat generated by the chickens, which would otherwise be wasted. Some greenhouses also rely on geothermal heating.

=== Cooling ===
Cooling is typically done by opening windows in the greenhouse when it gets too warm for the plants inside it. This can be done manually, or in an automated manner. Window actuators can open windows due to temperature difference or can be opened by electronic controllers. Electronic controllers are often used to monitor the temperature and adjusts the furnace operation to the conditions. This can be as simple as a basic thermostat, but can be more complicated in larger greenhouse operations.

For very hot situations, a shade house providing cooling by shade may be used.

=== Lighting ===
During the day, light enters the greenhouse via the windows and is used by the plants. Some greenhouses are also equipped with grow lights (often LED lights) which are switched on at night to increase the amount of light the plants get, hereby increasing the yield with certain crops.

=== Carbon dioxide enrichment ===
The benefits of carbon dioxide enrichment to about 1100 parts per million in greenhouse cultivation to enhance plant growth has been known for nearly 100 years. After the development of equipment for the controlled serial enrichment of carbon dioxide, the technique was established on a broad scale in the Netherlands. Secondary metabolites, e.g., cardiac glycosides in Digitalis lanata, are produced in higher amounts by greenhouse cultivation at enhanced temperature and at enhanced carbon dioxide concentration. Carbon dioxide enrichment can also reduce greenhouse water usage by a significant fraction by mitigating the total air-flow needed to supply adequate carbon for plant growth and thereby reducing the quantity of water lost to evaporation. Commercial greenhouses are now frequently located near appropriate industrial facilities for mutual benefit. For example, Cornerways Nursery in the UK is strategically placed near a major sugar refinery, consuming both waste heat and CO_{2} from the refinery which would otherwise be vented to atmosphere. The refinery reduces its carbon emissions, whilst the nursery enjoys boosted tomato yields and does not need to provide its own greenhouse heating.

Enrichment only becomes effective where, by Liebig's law, carbon dioxide has become the limiting factor. In a controlled greenhouse, irrigation may be trivial, and soils may be fertile by default. In less-controlled gardens and open fields, rising CO_{2} levels only increase primary production to the point of soil depletion (assuming no droughts, flooding, or both), as demonstrated prima facie by CO_{2} levels continuing to rise. In addition, laboratory experiments, free air carbon enrichment (FACE) test plots, and field measurements provide replicability.

== Types ==
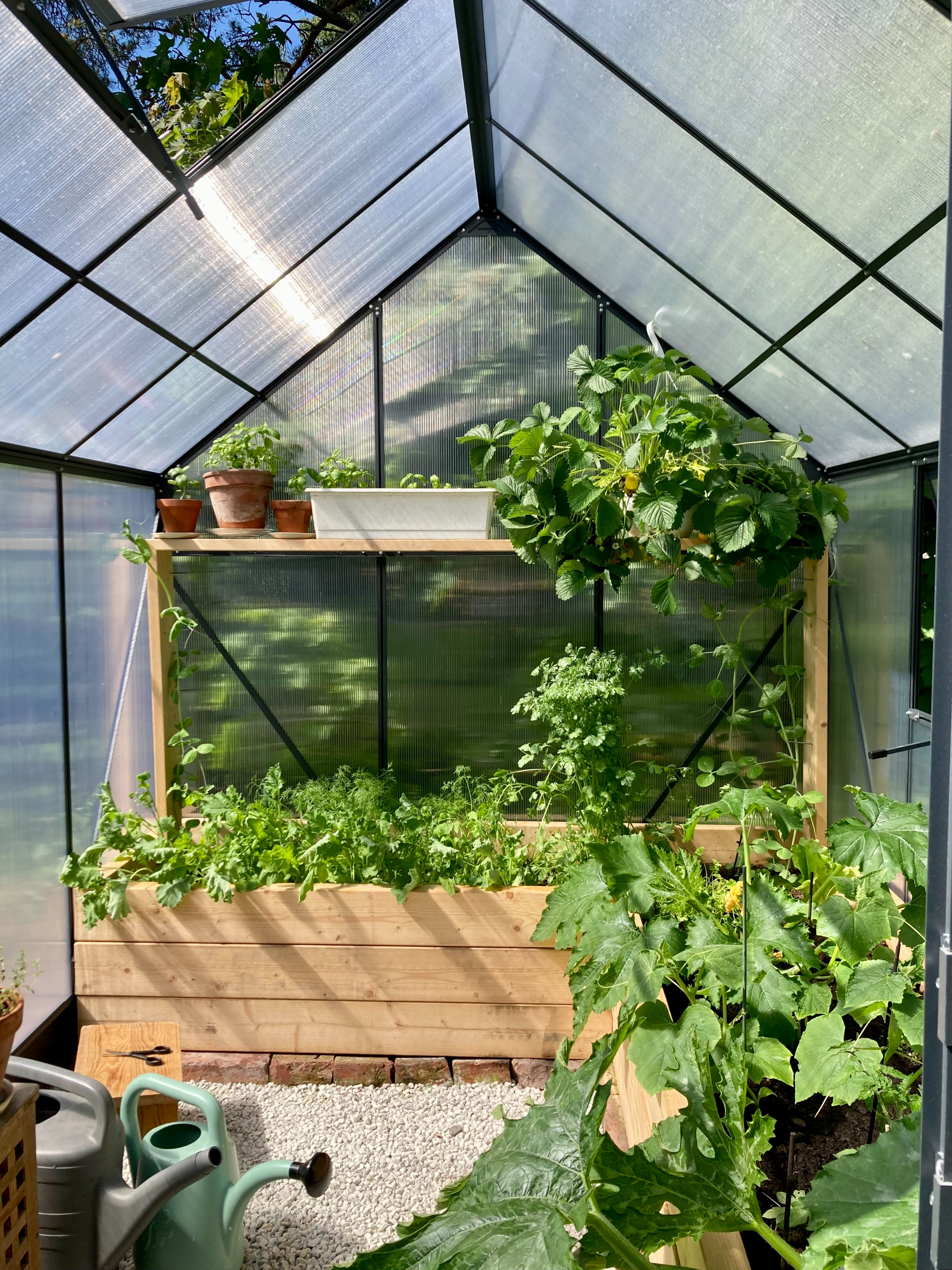
Private greenhouse in Finland.

In domestic greenhouses, the glass used is typically 3 mm (1/8 in) "horticultural glass" grade, which is good quality glass that should not contain air bubbles (which can produce scorching on leaves by acting like lenses).

Plastics mostly used are polyethylene film and multi-wall sheets of polycarbonate material, or PMMA acrylic glass.

Commercial glass greenhouses are often high-tech production facilities for vegetables or flowers. The glass greenhouses are filled with equipment such as screening installations, heating, cooling and lighting, and may be automatically controlled by a computer.

=== Dutch Light ===
In the UK and other Northern European countries a pane of horticultural glass referred to as "Dutch Light" was historically used as a standard unit of construction, having dimensions of 28 3/4 in × 56 in (730 mm × 1,420 mm). This size gives a larger glazed area when compared with using smaller panes such as the 600 mm width typically used in modern domestic designs which then require more supporting framework for a given overall greenhouse size. A style of greenhouse having sloped sides (resulting in a wider base than at eaves height) and using these panes uncut is also often referred to as "Dutch Light design", and a cold frame using a full- or half-pane as being of "Dutch" or "half-Dutch" size.

=== Greenhouses with spectrally selective solar modules ===
Researchers have developed photovoltaic modules which constantly allow some light to pass through to plants. Ideally, these modules would let through the wavelengths needed by the interior plants, but use the other wavelengths to generate electricity. In future, these might be used in greenhouses. For example, semi-transparent PV have successfully been used to increase the yield of spicy peppers in greenhouses.

In 2015 Wen Liu proposed curved glass panels covered with a dichroitic polymer film that selectively transmits blue and red wavelengths for crop photosynthesis. All other wavelengths are reflected and concentrated on solar cells for power generation using a dual tracking system. Shadow effects are eliminated since the crops receive the wavelengths necessary for photosynthesis. Several awards have been granted such as the R&D100 prize (2017).

Selecting the optimum color tint and transparency for crop yield and electricity generation requires experimentation. Semi-transparent panels use clear backsheets to enhance food production beneath. In this option, fixed panels enable the sun to spray sunlight over the plants below, thereby reducing over-exposure.

=== High-latitude solar greenhouses ===
Specialized designs exist to allow for growing of crops in the colder climates at higher latitudes. In northern areas of China such as Shenyang, slanted solar greenhouses are used to provide efficient, passive heating of crops. This heating has been shown to prevent crops from reaching lethally low temperatures, even when active heating elements are disabled. This style of greenhouse was first constructed in 1978, growing in popularity during the 1980s.

== Uses ==
Greenhouses allow for greater control over the growing environment of plants. Depending upon the technical specification of a greenhouse, key factors that may be controlled include temperature, levels of light and shade, irrigation, fertilizer application, and atmospheric humidity. Greenhouses may be used to overcome shortcomings in the growing qualities of a piece of land, such as a short growing season or poor light levels, and they can thereby improve food production in marginal environments. Shade houses are used specifically to provide shade in hot, dry climates.

As they may enable certain crops to be grown throughout the year, greenhouses are increasingly important in the food supply of high-latitude countries. One of the largest complexes in the world is in Almería, Andalucía, Spain, where greenhouses cover almost 200 km^{2} (49,000 acres).

Greenhouses are often used for growing flowers, vegetables, fruits, and transplants. Special greenhouse varieties of certain crops, such as tomatoes, are generally used for commercial production.

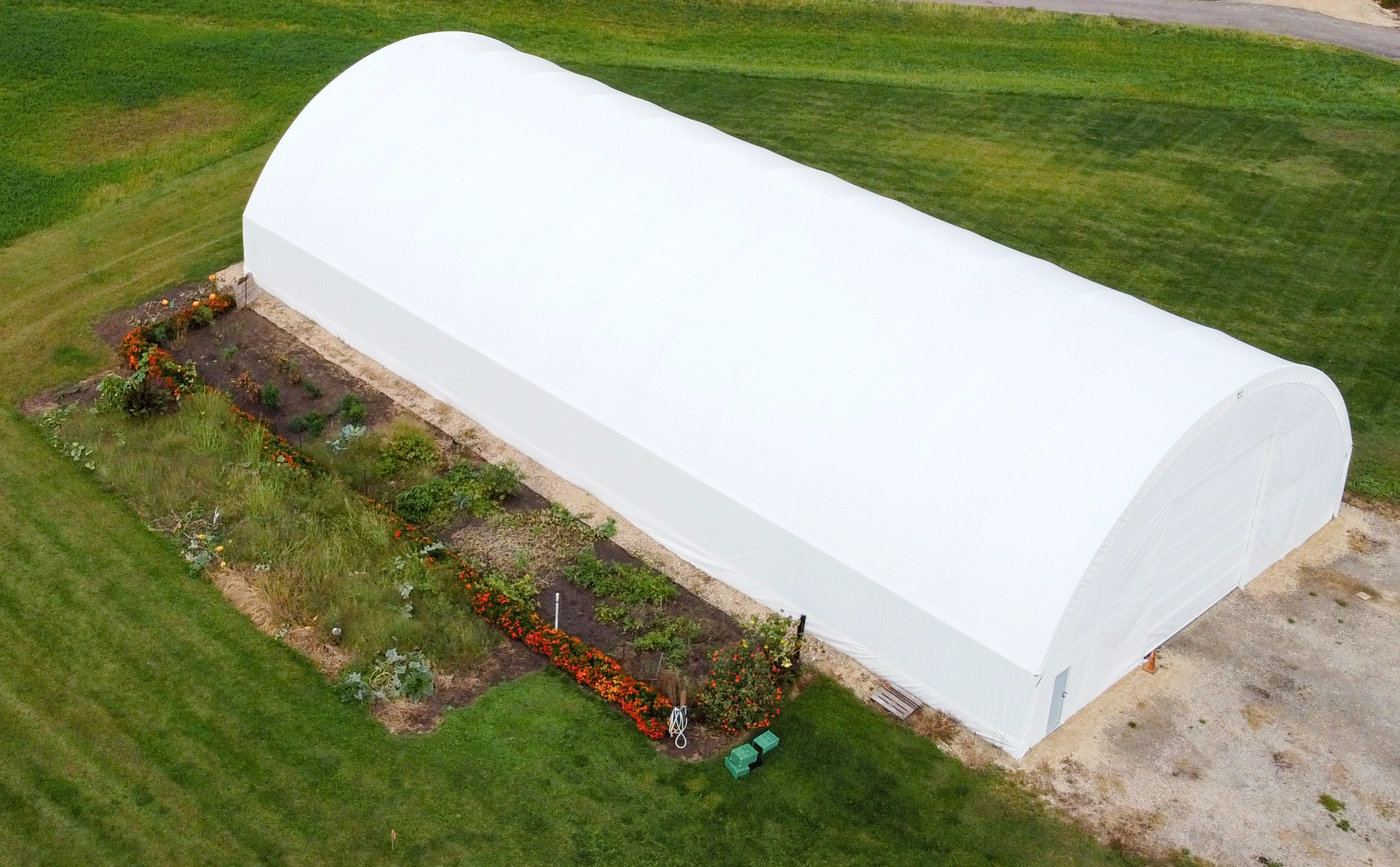
Tension fabric greenhouse

Many vegetables and flowers can be grown in greenhouses in late winter and early spring, and then transplanted outside as the weather warms. Seed tray racks can also be used to stack seed trays inside the greenhouse for later transplanting outside. Hydroponics (especially hydroponic A-frames) can be used to make the most use of the interior space when growing crops to mature size inside the greenhouse.

Bumblebees can be used as pollinators for pollination, but other types of bees have also been used, as well as artificial pollination.

The relatively closed environment of a greenhouse has its unique management requirements, compared with outdoor production. Pests and diseases, and extremes of temperature and humidity, have to be controlled, and irrigation is necessary to provide water. Most greenhouses use sprinklers or drip lines. Significant inputs of heat and light may be required, particularly with winter production of warm-weather vegetables.

Greenhouses also have applications outside of the agriculture industry. GlassPoint Solar, located in Fremont, California, encloses solar fields in greenhouses to produce steam for solar-enhanced oil recovery. For example, in November 2017 GlassPoint announced that it is developing a solar enhanced oil recovery facility near Bakersfield, CA that uses greenhouses to enclose its parabolic troughs.

An "alpine house" is a specialized greenhouse used for growing alpine plants. The purpose of an alpine house is to mimic the conditions in which alpine plants grow; particularly to protect from wet conditions in winter. Alpine houses are often unheated since the plants grown there are hardy, or require at most protection from hard frost in the winter. They are designed to have excellent ventilation.

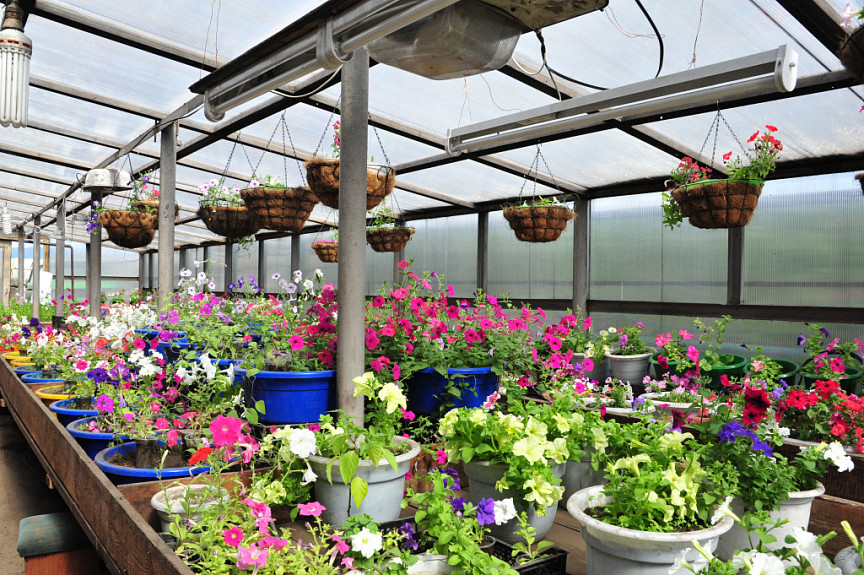
Flowers in a greenhouse

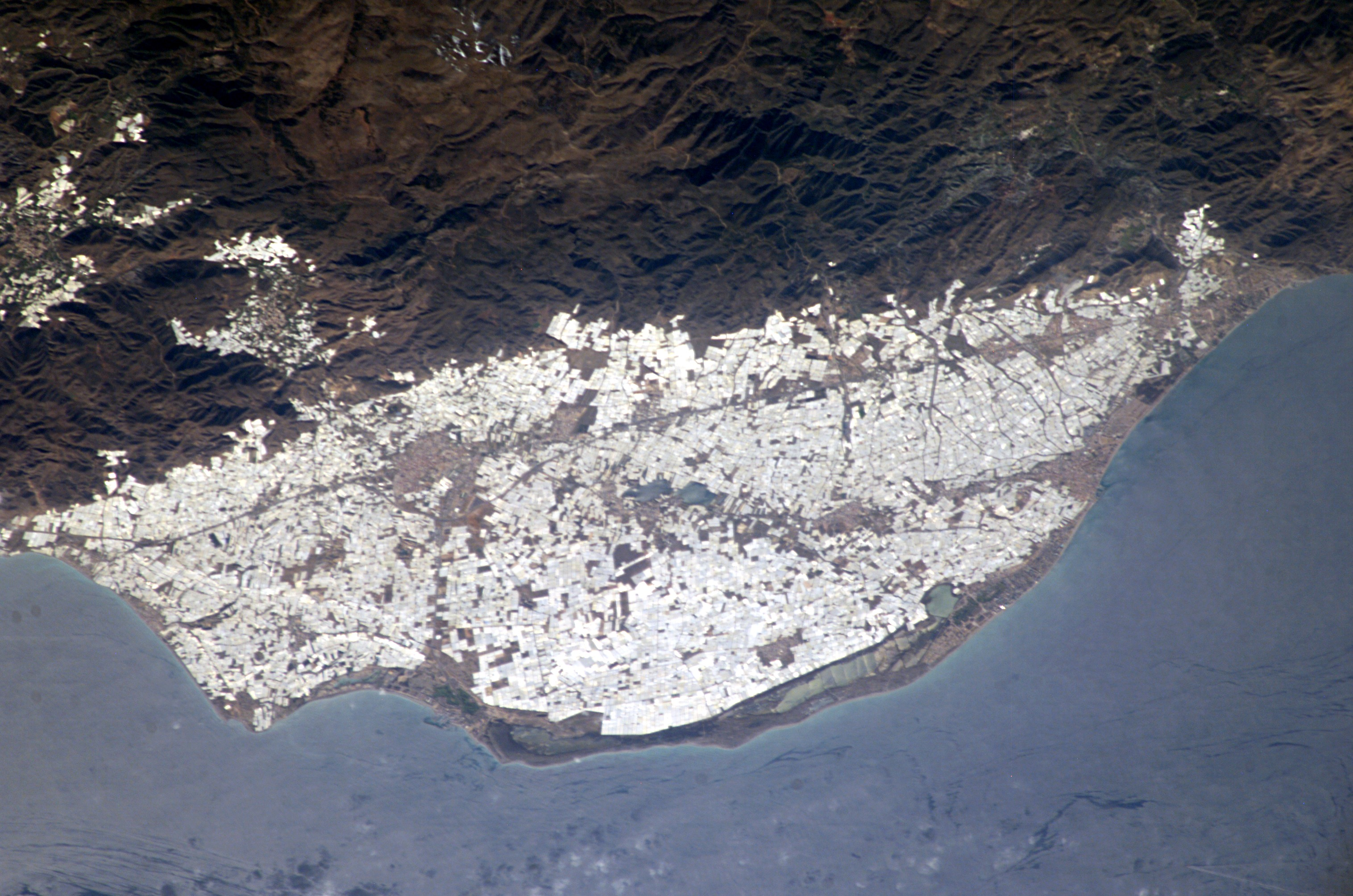
Greenhouses in Almería as seen from space

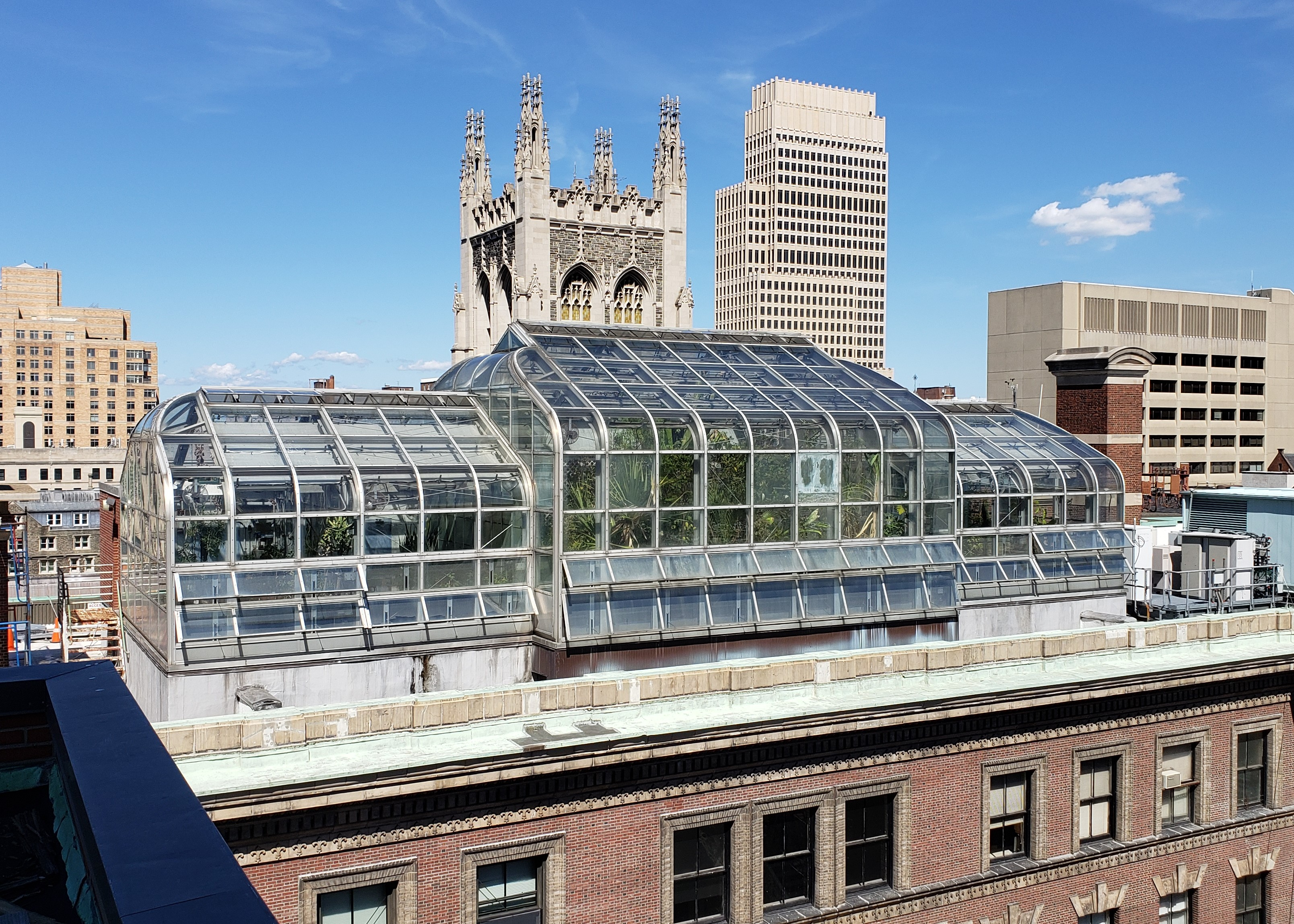
The Arthur Ross Greenhouse at Barnard College, used for research

== Adoption ==
Worldwide, there are an estimated nine million acres (about thirty-six and a half thousand square kilometers) of greenhouses.

=== Netherlands ===
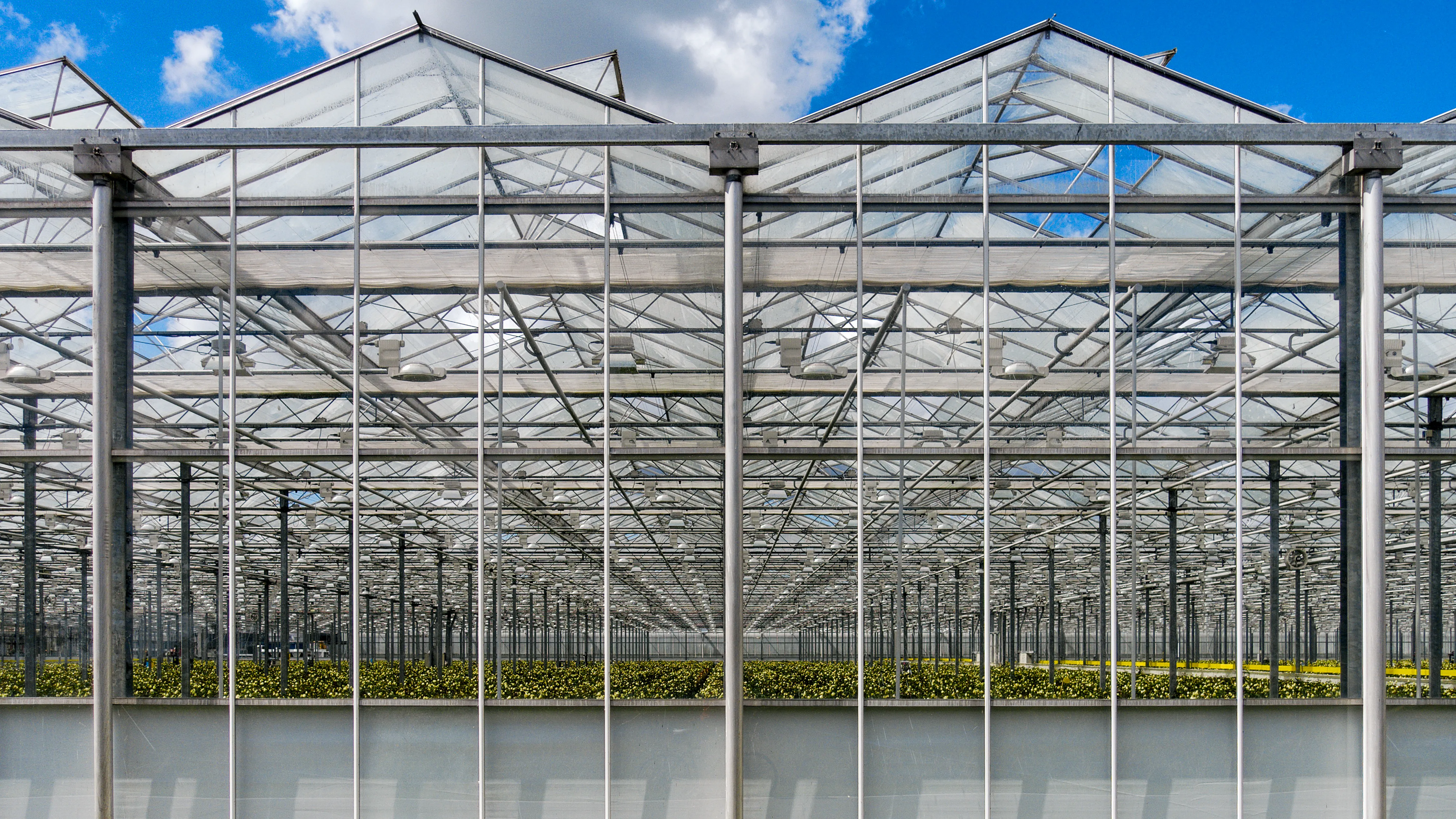
Greenhouses in the Westland region

The Netherlands has some of the largest greenhouses in the world. Such is the scale of food production in the country that in 2017, greenhouses occupied nearly 5,000 hectares.

Greenhouses began to be built in the Westland region of the Netherlands in the mid-19th century. The addition of sand to bogs and clay soil created fertile soil for agriculture, and around 1850, grapes were grown in the first greenhouses, simple glass constructions with one of the sides consisting of a solid wall. By the early 20th century, greenhouses began to be constructed with all sides built using glass, and they began to be heated. This also allowed for the production of fruits and vegetables that did not ordinarily grow in the area. Today, the Westland and the area around Aalsmeer have the highest concentration of greenhouse agriculture in the world. The Westland produces mostly vegetables, besides plants and flowers; Aalsmeer is noted mainly for the production of flowers and potted plants. Since the 20th century, the area around Venlo and parts of Drenthe have also become important regions for greenhouse agriculture.

Since 2000, technical innovations have included the "closed greenhouse", a completely closed system allowing the grower complete control over the growing process while using less energy. Floating greenhouses are used in watery areas of the country.

The Netherlands has around 4,000 greenhouse enterprises that operate over 9,000 hectares of greenhouses and employ some 150,000 workers, producing €7.2 billion worth of vegetables, fruit, plants, and flowers, some 80% of which is exported.

== See also ==
- Bioshelter
- Biosphere 2 – Closed ecological research center in Arizona
- Conservatory (greenhouse) – Greenhouse for the public display of plants
- Floriculture – Commercial production of flowering plants
- Greenhouse gas – Heat-trapping gas in an atmosphere
- High tunnel – Type of greenhouse
- IBTS Greenhouse – Egyptian desalination project
- Phytotron – Enclosed research greenhouse
- Plasticulture – Use of plastic materials in agriculture
- Row cover – Material used in agriculture and gardening
- Seasonal thermal energy storage – Storage of heat or cold for periods of up to several months
- Seawater greenhouse – Greenhouse technology for arid regions
- Sunroom – Room with large glass windows or walls for sunlight
- Tessellated roof
- Vertical farming – Growing crops in stacked layers
- Winter garden – Kind of garden maintained in wintertime

== General and cited references ==
- Cunningham, Anne S. (2000). Crystal palaces: garden conservatories of the United States. Princeton Architectural Press, New York, ISBN 1-56898-242-9
- Francesco Pona: Il Paradiso de' Fiori overo Lo archetipo de' Giardini, 1622 Angelo Tamo, Verona (a manual of gardening with use greenhouse for make Giardino all'italiana)
- Pevsner, Nikolaus. A History of Building Types, Thames and Hudson, 1976 (1984 ed.), ISBN 0500271747.
- Valera, D. L.; Belmonte, L.J.; Molina, F.D.; López, A. (2016). Greenhouse agriculture in Almería. A comprehensive techno-economic analysis. Ed. Cajamar Caja Rural. 408pp.
- van de Muijzenberg, Erwin W B (1980). A History of Greenhousesn. Wageningen, Netherlands: Institute for Agricultural Engineering. OCLC 7164418.
- Vleeschouwer, Olivier de (2001). Greenhouses and conservatories. Flammarion, Paris, ISBN 2-08-010585-X.
- Woods, May; Warren, Arete Swartz (1988). Glass houses: history of greenhouses, orangeries and conservatories. London: Aurum Press. ISBN 978-0-906053-85-0. OCLC 17108422.
