= Floriculture in Canada =

In 2001, the Canadian floriculture industry was valued at $904 million CAD. To give a more recent figure, Canadian floricultural farm cash receipts in 2013 totalled $1.09 billion CAD. In 2011, there were 2,278 floricultural farms in Canada.

Of the provinces, Ontario has the greatest share in this industry—nearly 45% in 2004. Correspondingly Ontario dominates in exports to the U.S. 9,500 people of mainly Dutch and Danish background were employed by Ontario's floriculture industry in 2004. Southern Ontario's strategic location within 12 hours by road of half of the U.S. urban population is cited as one of the major sources of its success in floriculture.
