= Westland (region), Netherlands =

Region of the Netherlands

Coordinates: 52°0′29″N 4°13′14″E

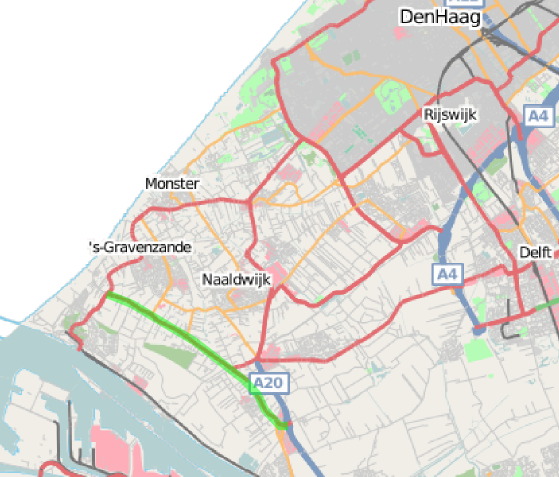
Map of Westland

Flag of Westland

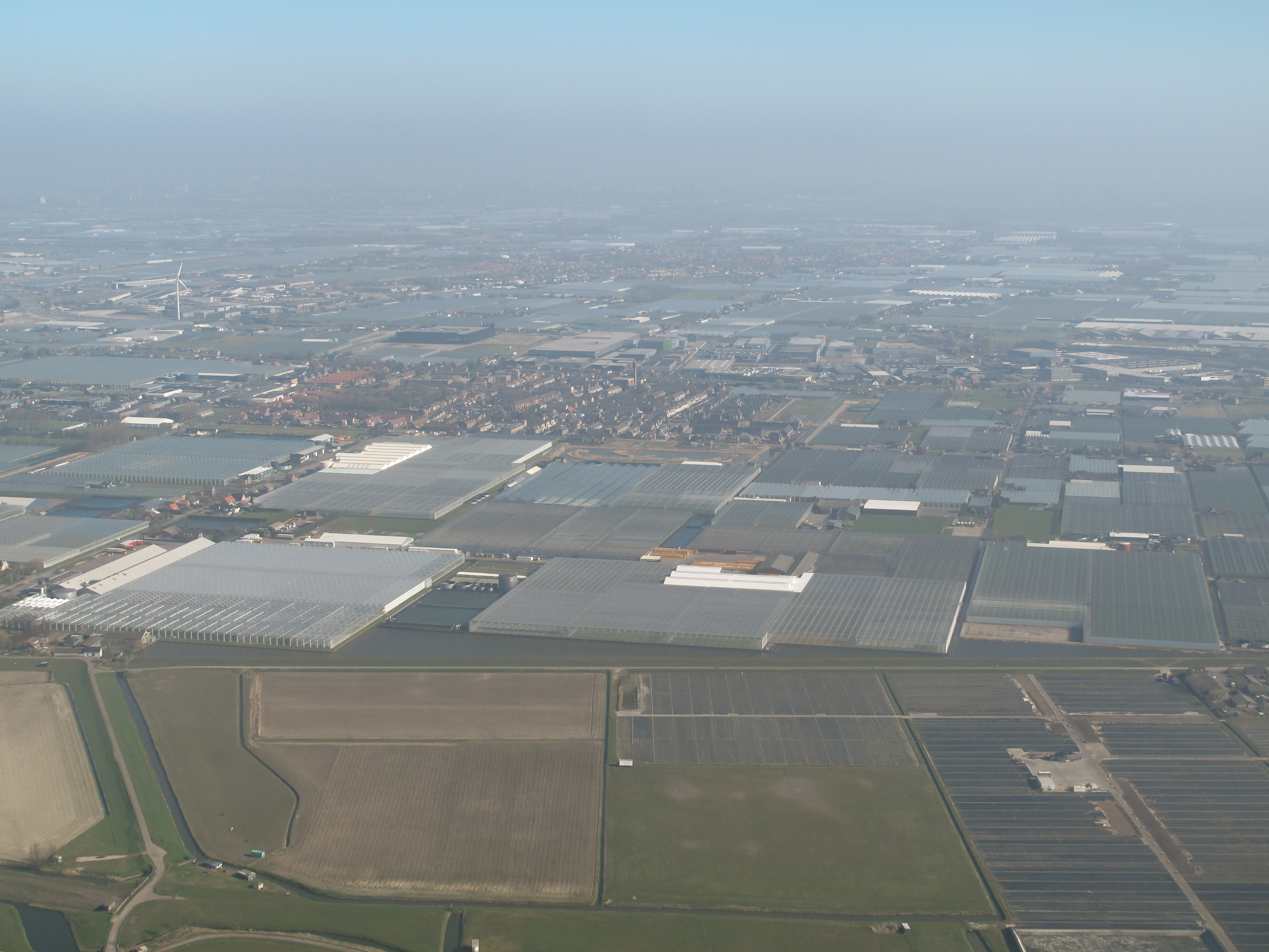
Aerial view of greenhouses in the Westland

Westland is a region of the Netherlands and lies in the western part of the Province of South Holland. It consists of the municipalities of Westland and Midden-Delfland, and also of the town of Hook of Holland (which is a part of the municipality of Rotterdam).

Westland is well known for its horticulture in glasshouses, hence its nickname the glass city.

== Greenhouse horticulture ==
Greenhouses were already in use in some country estates from the 18th century, but in the 19th century it was decided to place glass windows against the grape walls to protect the grapes from bad Indian summers, which disrupted ripening. Moreover, this also allowed the ripening time to be shortened. This introduced the modern greenhouse horticulture. New inventions such as the lessenaarskas, the kopkas, the druivenserre, the broeibak and the agricultural warenhuis eventually led to the modern greenhouse. From the end of the 19th century, but especially in the period just after 1900, the greenhouse was introduced on a large scale in the Westland, which again completely changed its appearance: over time, about three-quarters of the horticultural area was covered with greenhouses.

Grape cultivation increased enormously before the outbreak of the World War II, but collapsed after the war because the southern European countries were able to supply grapes much more cheaply. As a replacement for grapes, the cultivation of tomatoes, lettuce and cucumbers emerged and few grapes are grown in the Westland. From the 1960s onwards, the cultivation of cut flowers also became increasingly important. These products are all mainly intended for export. After the First World War, rail transport was supplanted by road transport, for which a large number of new roads were built to bring the products quickly to the sales markets.

The Westland is a prosperous and innovative region, due to the fast-growing development in the field of agribusiness. Many new techniques are emerging to enable us to function better as a horticultural company, from the closed greenhouse to the convertible greenhouse. The greenhouse horticulture area, the Glass City, is largely limited to the municipality of Westland. The street name Laan van de Glazen Stad in Naaldwijk also refers to this. In Midden-Delfland (as argued above also part of the Westland region) livestock farming predominates .

Grapes being picked in a greenhouse in Westland in 1936

Harvest in 1943

Grape festival in Westland in 1951

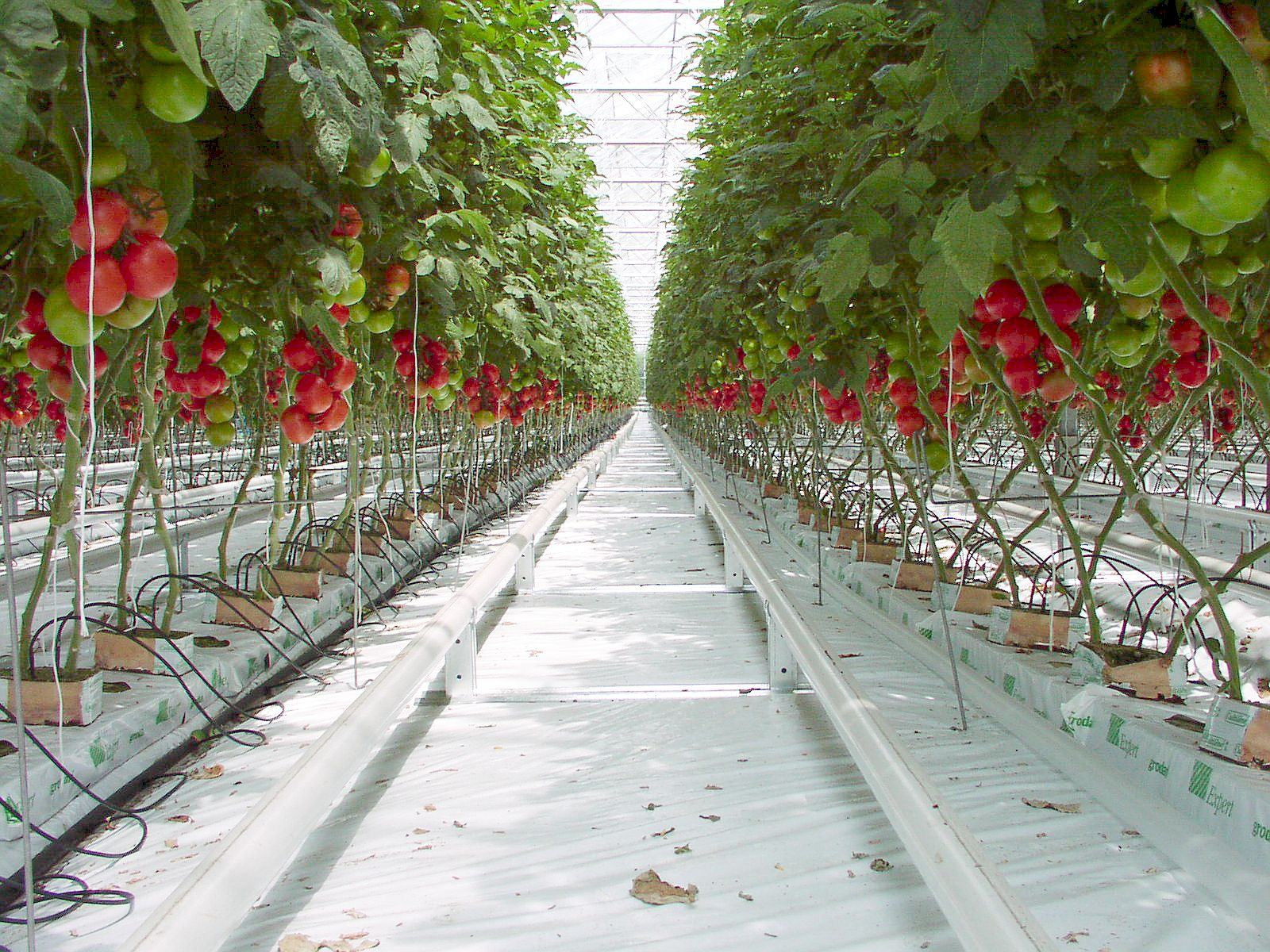
Tomatoes growing
