= Shade house =

Horticultural structure

A shade house is a horticultural structure which provides a mix of shade and light to provide suitable conditions for shade-loving plants, or to reduce the temperatures under the cover. Typically it will have a frame which supports mesh fabric or wood lath.

Shade houses may also be used in commercial horticulture. For example, vanilla vines need 50% shade and, in deforested areas of Mexico, this is provided by shade houses of 1,000 – 10,000 square metres. These have tree-like support posts or actual living trees. From these, shade cloth walls of 3–5 metres height are suspended and these are black or red to cut the luminosity by half.

== Gallery ==
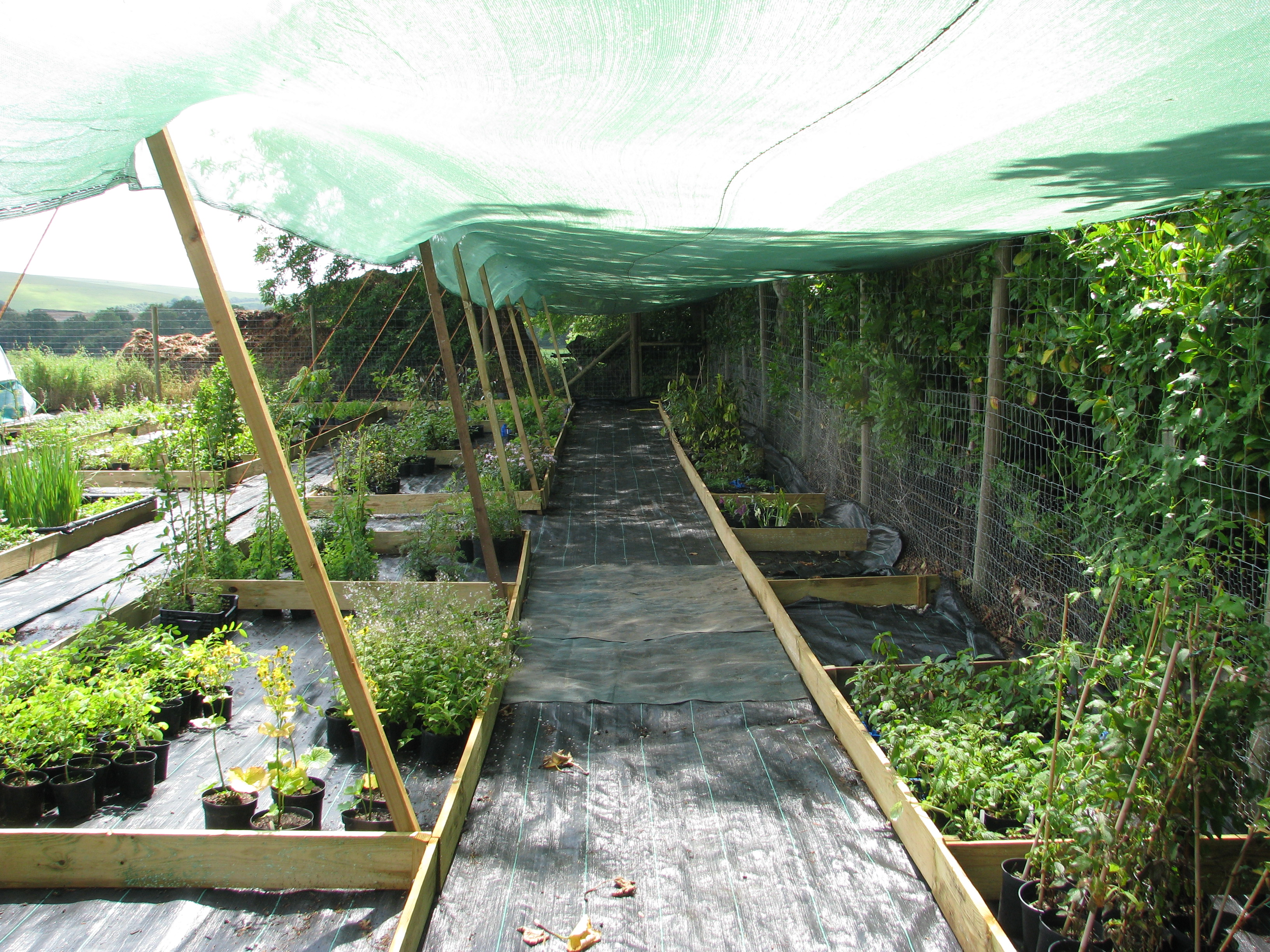
A fabric shade house in England

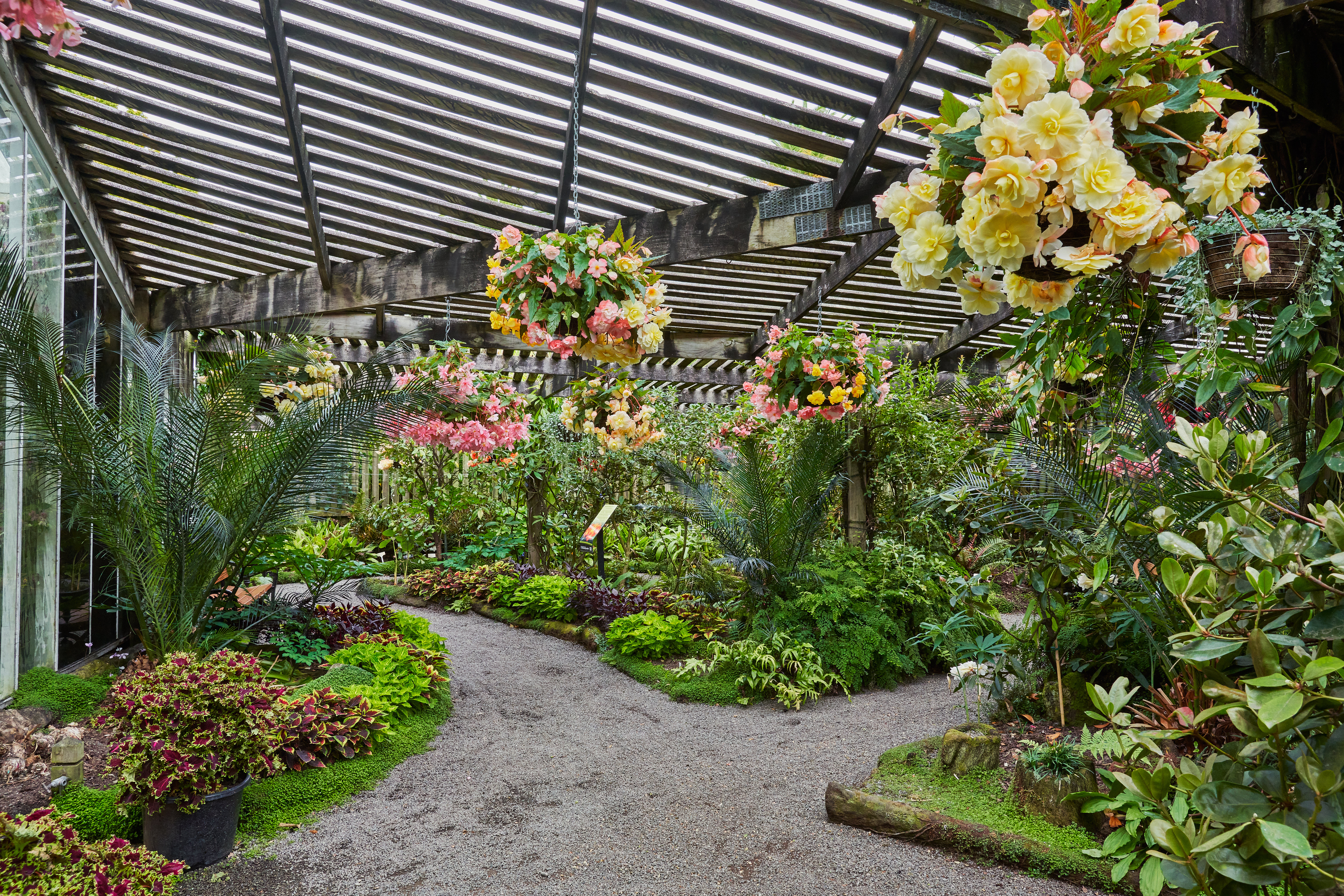
Lath house at the Peter Black Conservatory in New Zealand

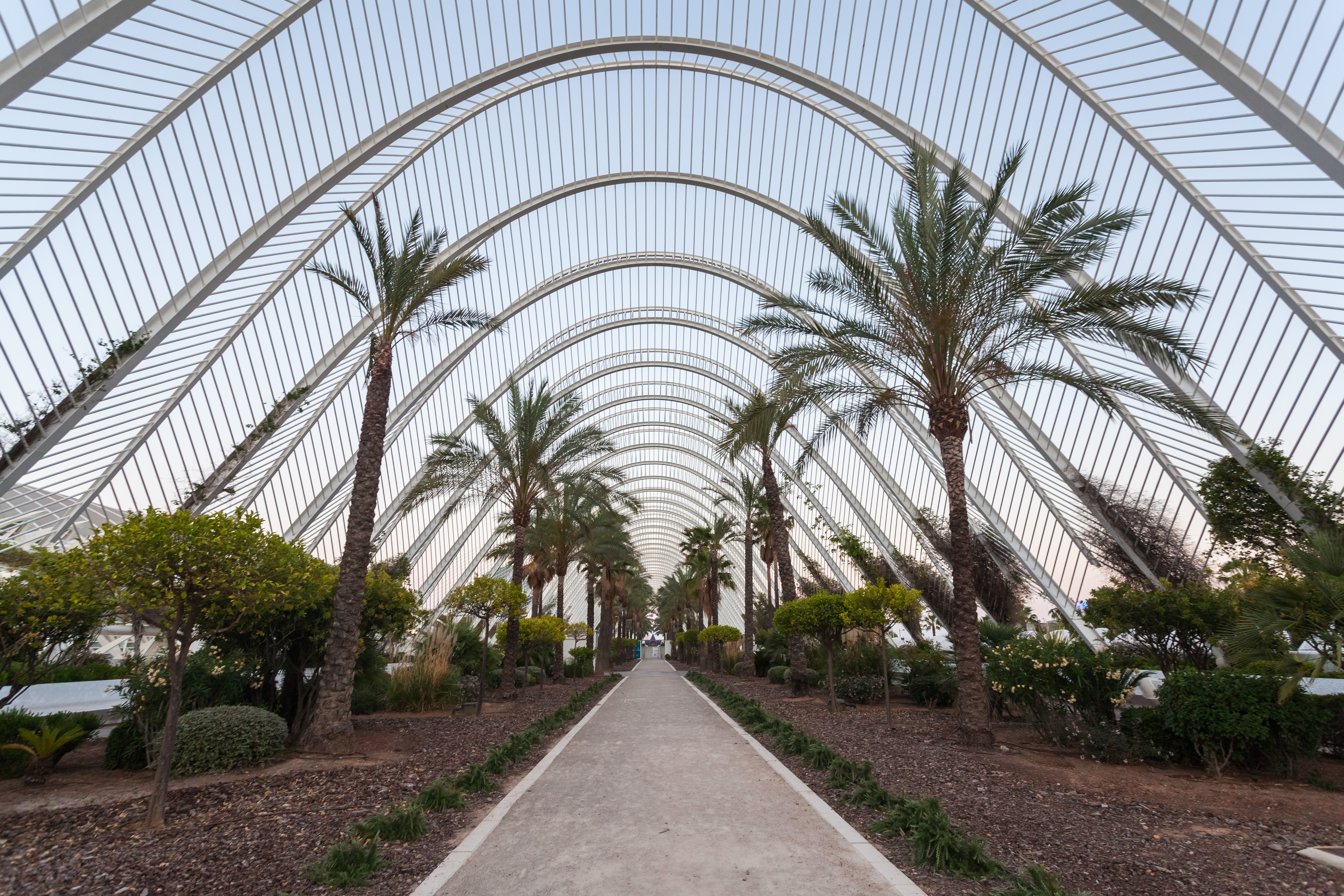
The Shade House, part of a public garden in Valencia, Spain

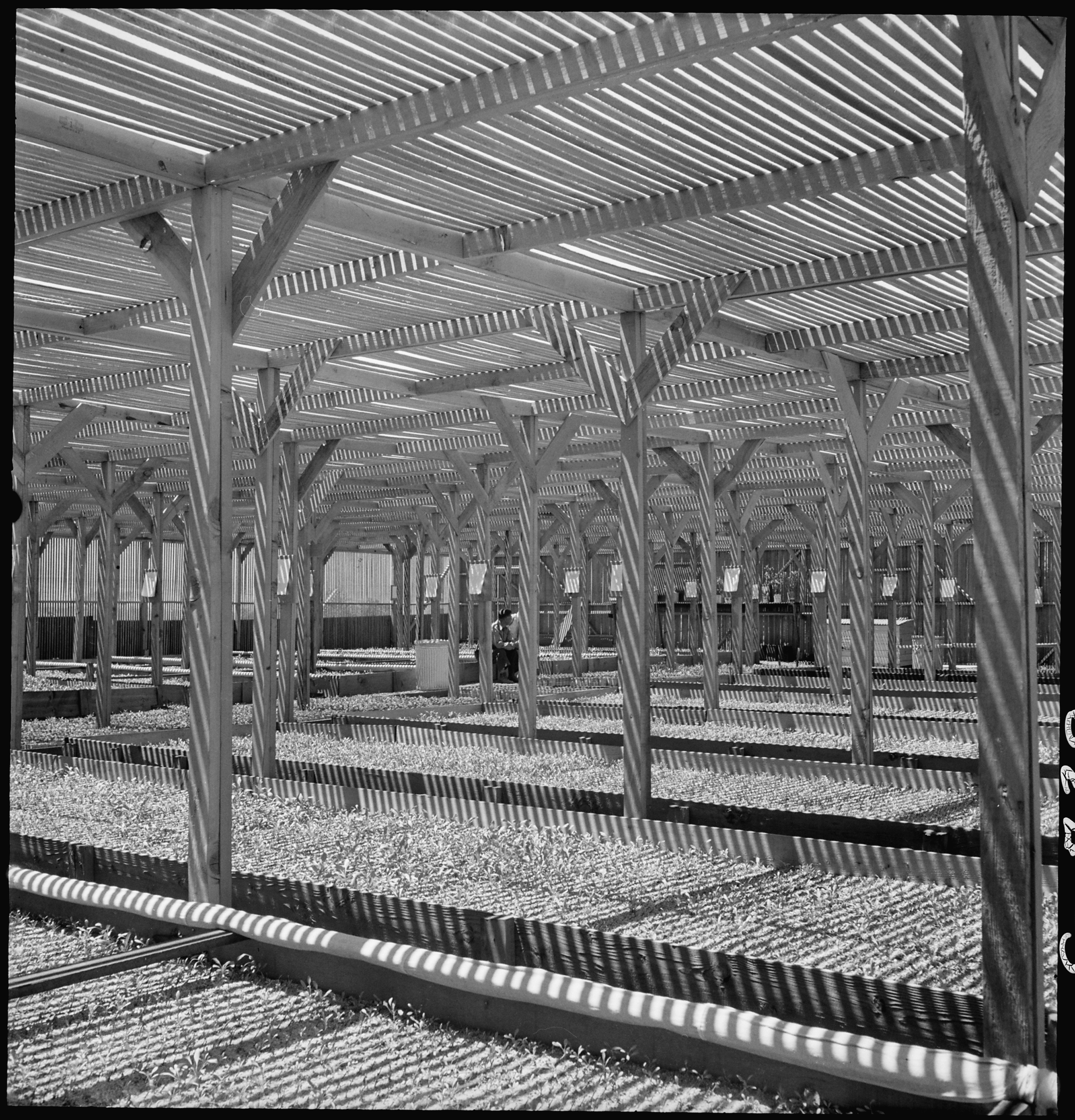
A lath house for starting seedlings, California 1942

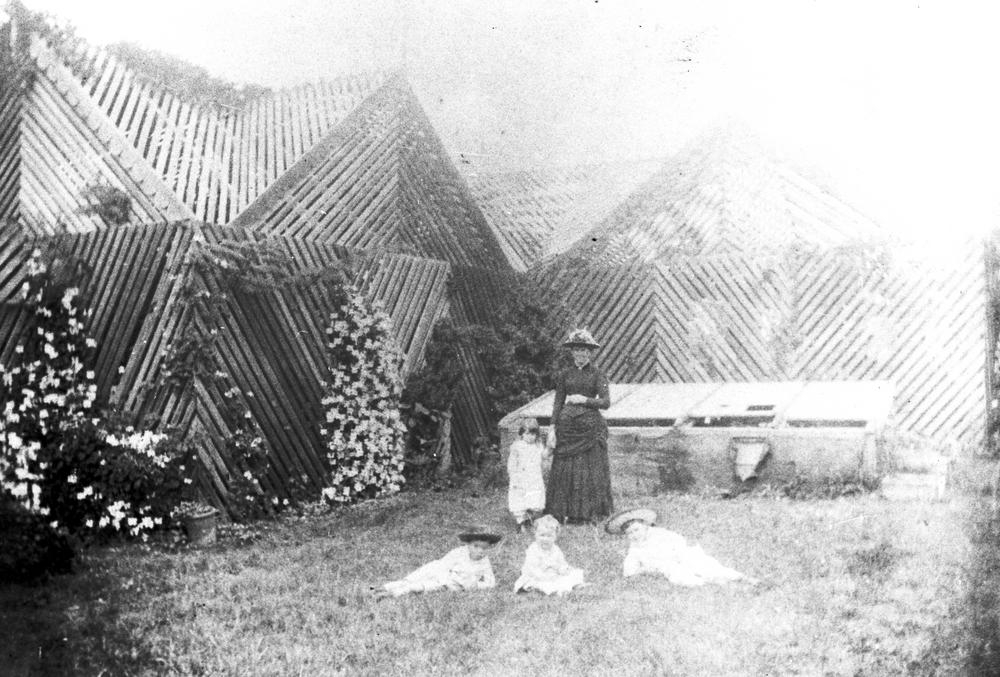
A lath house in 1900 Australia
