= Ebb and flow hydroponics =

Hydroponic farming technique

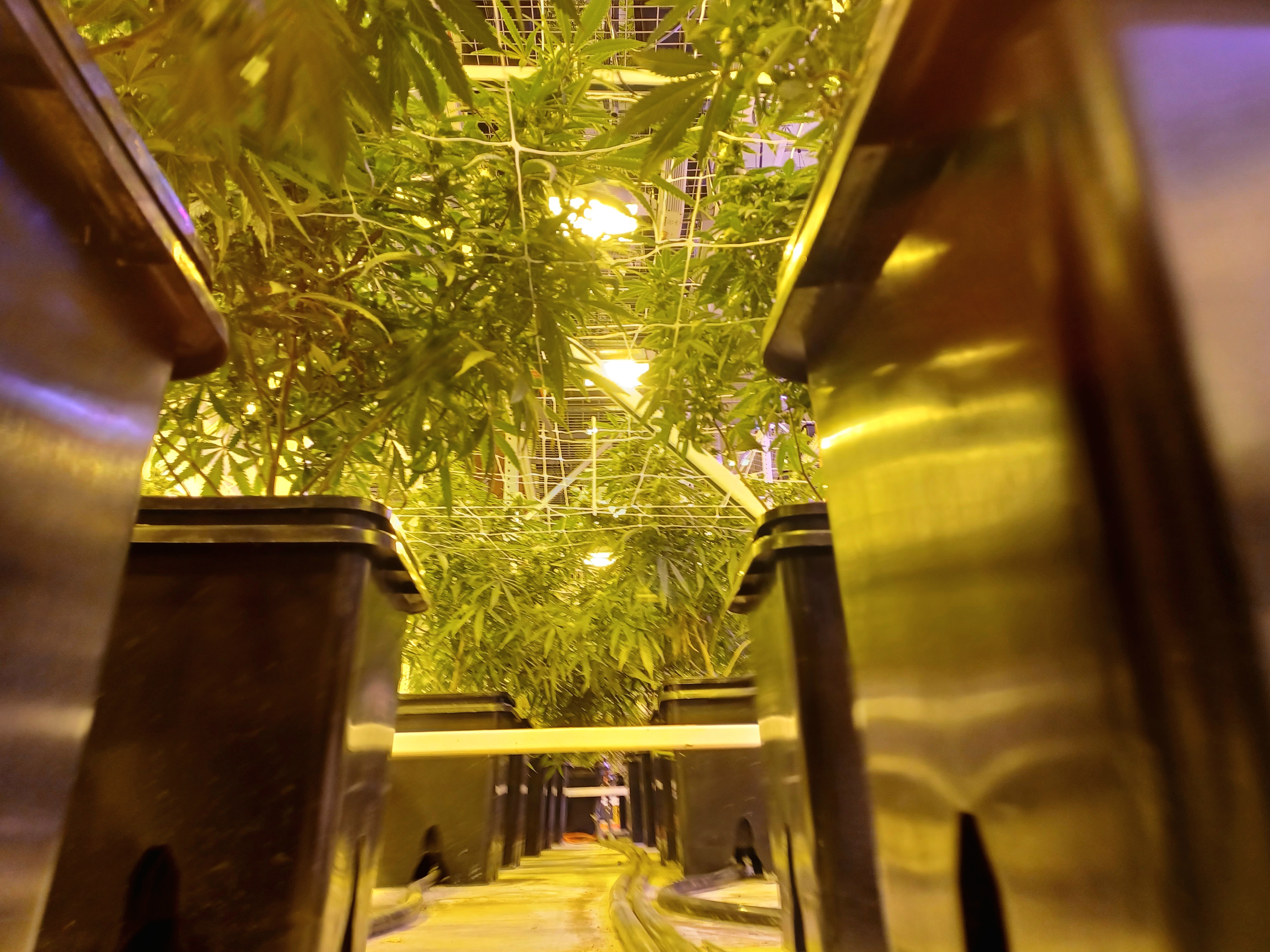
Detail of an ebb-and-flow system, nutrient-rich water is pumped through the hoses connecting the containers

Ebb and flow hydroponics is a form of hydroponics that is known for its simplicity, reliability of operation and low initial investment cost. Pots are filled with an inert medium which does not function like soil or contribute nutrition to the plants but which anchors the roots and functions as a temporary reserve of water and solvent mineral nutrients. The hydroponic solution alternately floods the system and is allowed to ebb away.

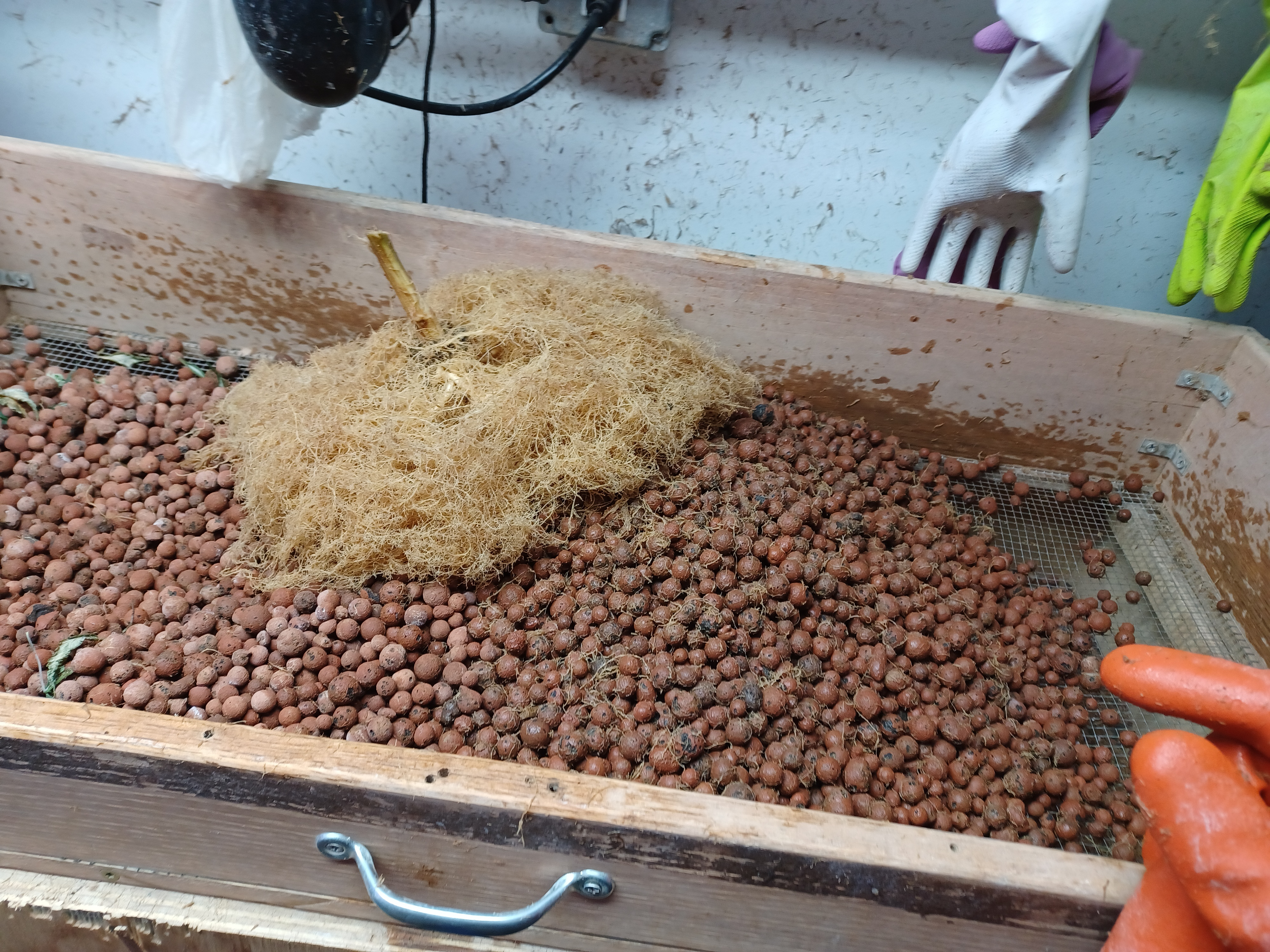
A root ball and the growing medium required to grow a single plant. The medium will be washed and sanitized before being re-used.

Under this system, water-tight growing containers are filled with a inert growing medium. A medium can consist of Expanded clay aggregate, rockwool cubes, or other inert materials. This is periodically flooded for a short period with a nutrient solution pumped from a supply tank. The solution then is either pumped or flows by gravity back to the supply tank. This hydroponic growing system can be very effective for any size plants depending on space. The method is inefficient in its use of water and plant nutrient reagents. Root disease occurrence and nutrient element insufficiency can occur without repeated use of the solution without proper oxygenation of the containers that are flooded. Because it is a "closed" system, the re-circulated nutrient solution requires monitoring every time the system flows back the reservoir for pH and PPM. Within the growing period, the nutrient solution may require replacement. The rooting medium may require washing to remove root debris and accumulated precipitates as well as sterilization if it is being reused.

== Principles of operation ==
The fundamental principle of hydroponics relies on fertilized and aerated water which provides both nutrition and oxygen to a plant's root zone. It often involves relatively sophisticated mechanization processes which can be daunting to casual hobbyists. Nutrient solutions must usually be below the temperature at which pathogen growth can begin, yet not so cool that root activity is suppressed. Active aeration of the fertilizer solution is common, since root systems themselves remove oxygen, creating conditions which also can promote pathogenic bacteria and water-borne molds.

E&F utilizes the fact that the solution is not left in constant contact with the roots of plants, to avoid the need for oxygenating or chilling of the solution. Instead it relies on characteristics of root function to provide passive oxygenation at a high level which tends to suppress pathogen growth.

Simplicity is maintained through usage of a single, two-directional path for the solution. Water flows in and out using the same tube. When the pump has raised water into the tray, briefly submerging the roots, the pump is rendered inactive using a switch, typically a timer, and the water flows or is pumped back down the same tube.

Ebb and flow systems come on according to the water-holding capacity of the medium in which the roots sit. Highly water-retentive media can require watering only once a day, while others require two to as many as six floodings. The time it takes to flood the roots is not a critical parameter, which means that pumps are often moderate in capacity and can be small for systems sustaining indoor plants. This makes the method popular with amateur and urban gardeners. Gravity acts as drain pump in some systems, and aeration is accomplished through thin-filming and positive displacement of air as it is forced out of the root zone by water.

Ebb-and-flow is versatile in that a variety of substrates can be used, including single-use mediums like rockwool cubes, peat, or coir, or mediums such as lave rock or expanded clay aggregate that can be sanitized and re-used many times.

== Aeration ==
Aeration of an ebb and flow system is an important aspect of its operation. Automatic displacement eliminates air which has been de-oxygenated by the roots as the water rises to its highest flood stage. When the system flows back into the reservoir, it re-exposes the space around the roots to the air.

The film of water left around the roots during ebb has a high surface-to-mass ratio, which means that even as the roots absorb oxygen, its high surface area facilitates re-oxygenation, which can sustain the roots as long as their surfaces remain damp. The high oxygen content of water filmed in this way suppresses most harmful lifeforms, keeping the root zones disease free. In other types of hydroponics this function must be performed by cooling the solution to protect it from pythium, a form of water mold responsible for a condition called "root rot", in which the outer cells of the roots die, turn brown and slough off when handled. Need for supplementary oxygenation using air pumps is also eliminated, which increases reliability and reduces complexity.

Ebb and flow hydroponic systems are also quiet, while using less power than other hydroponic systems, which means that they can be used in environments where acoustic signature and excessive plumbing is objectionable, such as residential or classroom applications where space is at a premium.

== Drawbacks ==
Ebb and flow systems are flexible, with few practical drawbacks. Though typically known for compact cultivation of plants having smaller stature, it has been used for growing large plants, using buckets ranging in size from 1 gallon to 5 gallons, making use of high-volume pumps such as those in large aquariums, decorative fountains and koi ponds.

There are facets to these systems that present some labor investment in large-scale applications. These are primarily management of media between uses, such as washing and sterilization. This can be done by dumping into the tray and filling with a sterilizing solution such as hydrogen peroxide or chlorine solution, temporarily plugging the drain, with hand removal of root fragments. Larger containers require transferring the media to a suitable surface after sterilization to permit removal of leftover plant material.

A second drawback in designs where multiple plants are grown in the same container is that the roots tend to grow together, meaning removal of harvested or damaged plants can be somewhat problematic in plants having well-developed root systems. Commercial crops harvested at one time are somewhat immune to concerns related to that aspect of the system, but in the event of pathogenic invasion the problem can quickly spread, as all the roots share the same flood source.

Also, most ebb and flow systems use a recycling reservoir to flood the growing containers. Over a period of time the pH of the nutrient solution may fluctuate to a range which is unhealthy for the plant. If the pH is not corrected, various problems may occur, including but not limited to poor nutrient absorption and leaf cannibalization. As the name implies, leaf cannibalization occurs as the plant takes nutrients from one part of the plant and uses those nutrients in a different part of the plant. Leaf cannibalization appears as yellow or brown spots on leaves.

Poor drainage, or incomplete drainage, may cause a condition wherein dense roots are exposed to stagnant water which is trapped by the root mass. Root rot and fungal growth are the most common result of stagnant water. Some E&F systems are not as immune to root rot as a well-designed system would be. In tables where plants are larger than optimal for the system, this can create the need for modifications such as screens or beds of medium-sized gravel to prevent standing water. Tilting the tray is one way to achieve better drain characteristics. In bucket E&F this problem can be dealt with in a similar manner, ensuring good drainage through using medium of adequate size and ensuring that drainage of the container between flood cycles is complete.

Hydrogen peroxide is also added to nutrient solutions when there is suspicion that the anaerobic pythium root rot mold has begun to proliferate on the roots' surfaces. The oxygen liberated from the hydrogen peroxide is destructive to single-celled organisms and is administered in dosages which vary with the concentration of the peroxide. Typically several tablespoons or more of 3.5% peroxide solution per gallon of water are used. The temporary rise in the oxygen level is only minimally damaging to roots, while eradicating the water-borne mold can significantly increase yield or even save a crop's viability.
