= Environmental impact of agriculture =

The environmental impact of agriculture varies widely based on practices employed by farmers and by the scale of practice. Farming communities that try to reduce environmental impacts through modifying their practices will adopt sustainable agriculture practices. The negative impact of agriculture is an old issue that remains a concern even as experts design innovative means to reduce destruction and enhance eco-efficiency. Animal agriculture practices tend to be more environmentally destructive than agricultural practices focused on fruits, vegetables and other biomass. The emissions of ammonia from cattle waste continue to raise concerns over environmental pollution.

When evaluating environmental impact, experts use two types of indicators: "means-based", which is based on the farmer's production methods, and "effect-based", which is the impact that farming methods have on the farming system or on emissions to the environment. An example of a means-based indicator would be the quality of groundwater, which is affected by the amount of nitrogen applied to the soil. An indicator reflecting the loss of nitrate to groundwater would be effect-based. The means-based evaluation looks at farmers' practices of agriculture, and the effect-based evaluation considers the actual effects of the agricultural system. For example, the means-based analysis might look at pesticides and fertilization methods that farmers are using, and effect-based analysis would consider how much CO_{2} is being emitted or what the nitrogen content of the soil is.

The environmental impact of agriculture involves impacts on a variety of different factors: the soil, water, the air, animal and soil variety, people, plants, and the food itself. Agriculture contributes to a number larger of environmental issues that cause environmental degradation including: climate change, deforestation, biodiversity loss, dead zones, genetic engineering, irrigation problems, pollutants, soil degradation, and waste. Because of agriculture's importance to global social and environmental systems, the international community has committed to increasing sustainability of food production as part of Sustainable Development Goal 2: “End hunger, achieve food security and improved nutrition and promote sustainable agriculture". The United Nations Environment Programme's 2021 "Making Peace with Nature" report highlighted agriculture as both a driver and an industry under threat from environmental degradation.

== By agricultural practice ==
=== Animal agriculture ===
Agricultural practices have been found to have a variety of effects on the environment to some extent. Animal agriculture, in particular meat production, can cause pollution, greenhouse gas emissions, biodiversity loss, disease, and significant consumption of land, food, and water. Meat is obtained through a variety of methods, including organic farming, free-range farming, intensive livestock production, and subsistence agriculture. The livestock sector also includes wool, egg and dairy production, the livestock used for tillage, and fish farming.

Animal agriculture is a significant contributor to greenhouse gas emissions. Cows, sheep, and other ruminants digest their food by enteric fermentation, and their burps are the main source of methane emissions from land use, land-use change, and forestry. Together with methane and nitrous oxide from manure, this makes livestock the main source of greenhouse gas emissions from agriculture. A significant reduction in meat consumption is essential to mitigate climate change.

=== Irrigation ===
Countries with the highest share of water withdrawal by agriculture in total withdrawal

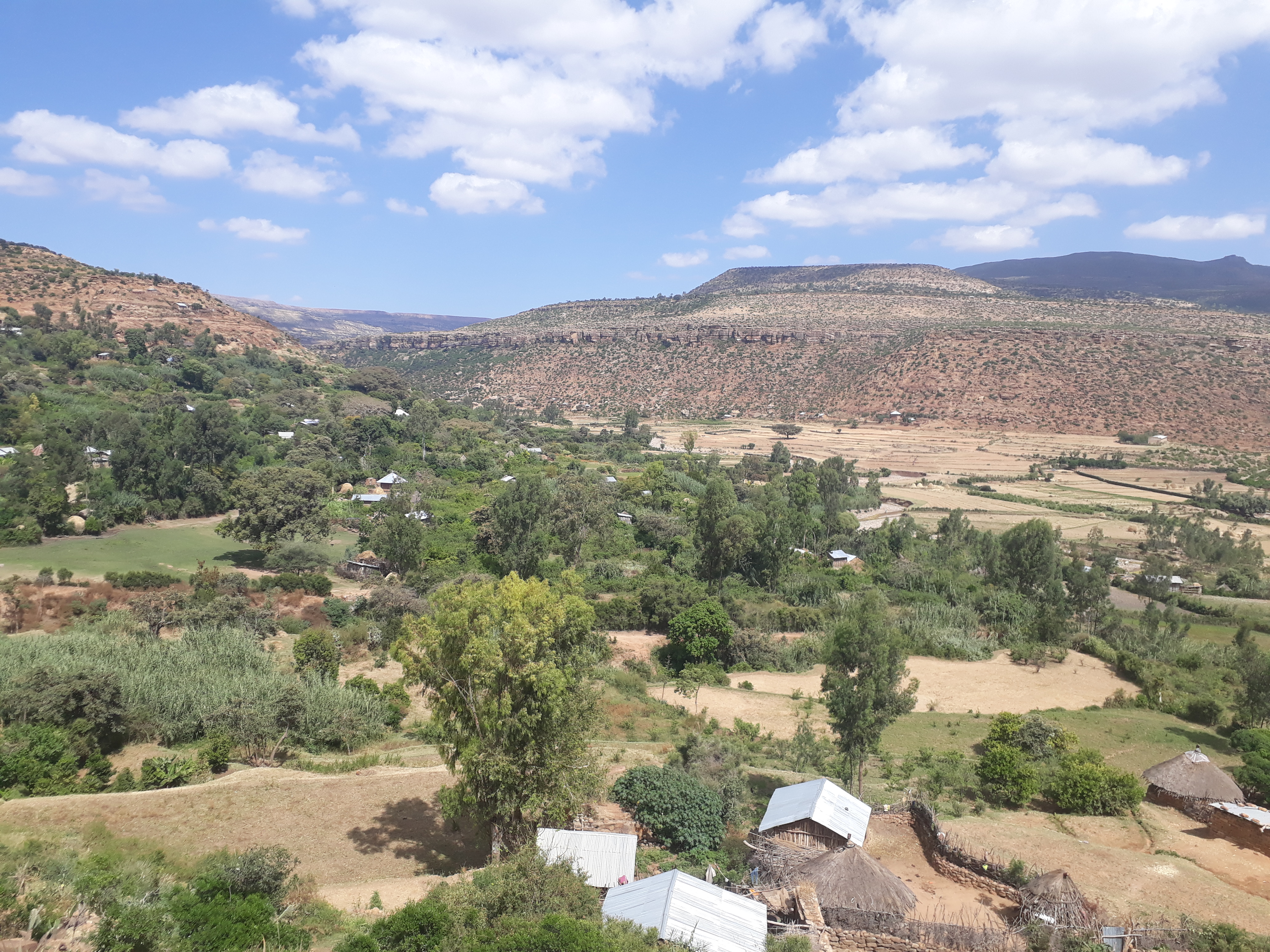
The first environmental effect is increased crop growth, such as in the Rubaksa gardens in Ethiopia.

The irrigation that grows crops, especially in dry countries, can also be responsible for taxing aquifers beyond their capacities. Groundwater depletion is embedded in the international food trade, with countries exporting crops grown from overexploited aquifers and setting up potential future food crises if the aquifers run dry.

The environmental impact of irrigation relates to the changes in quantity and quality of soil and water as a result of irrigation and the subsequent effects on natural and social conditions in river basins and downstream of an irrigation scheme. The effects stem from the altered hydrological conditions caused by the installation and operation of the irrigation scheme.

Amongst some of these problems is the depletion of underground aquifers through overdrafting. Soil can be over-irrigated due to poor distribution uniformity or management wastes water, chemicals, and may lead to water pollution. Over-irrigation can cause deep drainage from rising water tables that can lead to problems of irrigation salinity requiring watertable control by some form of subsurface land drainage. However, if the soil is under-irrigated, it gives poor soil salinity control, which leads to increased soil salinity with the consequent buildup of toxic salts on the soil surface in areas with high evaporation. This requires either leaching to remove these salts or a method of drainage to carry the salts away. Irrigation with saline or high-sodium water may damage soil structure owing to the formation of alkaline soil.

=== Pesticides ===
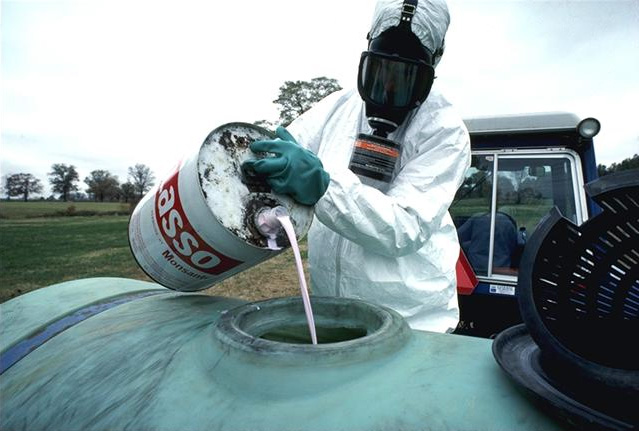
A farmworker wearing protective equipment pouring a concentrated pesticide into a sprayer tank with water

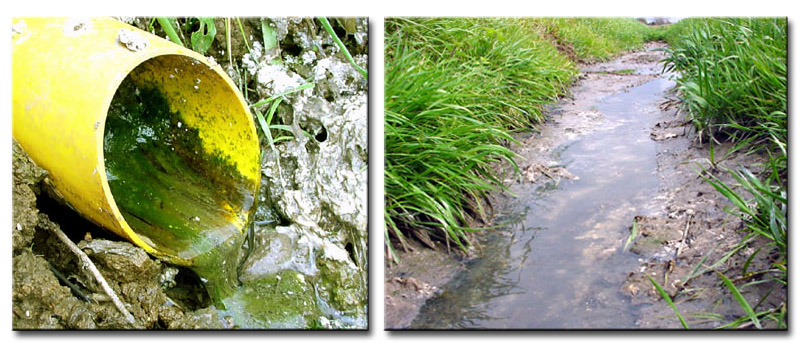
Drainage of fertilizers and pesticides into a stream

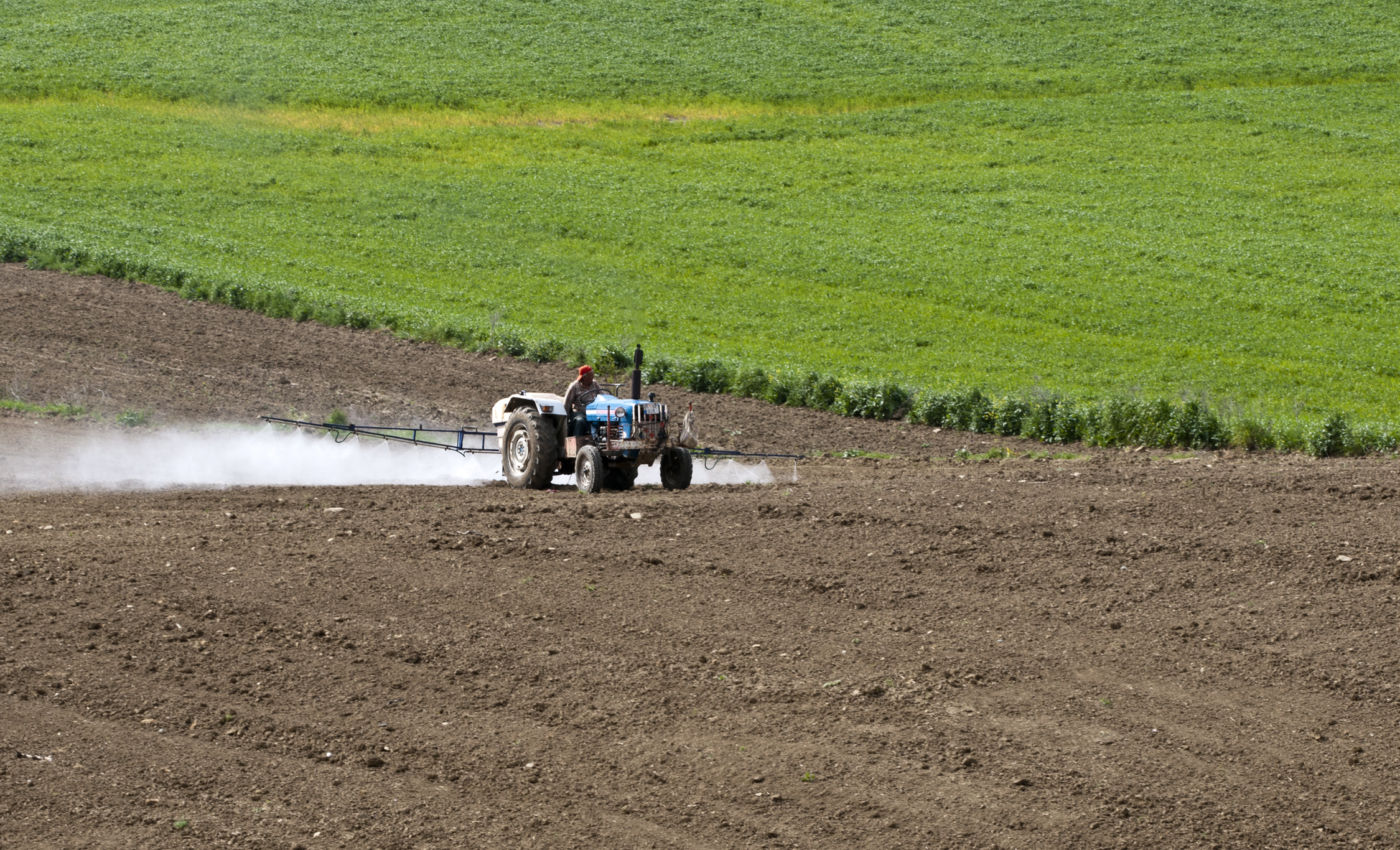
Pesticides being sprayed onto a recently plowed field by tractor. Aerial spraying is a main source of pesticide drift and application on loose topsoil increases the chance of runoff into waterways.

The environmental effects of pesticides describe the broad series of consequences of using pesticides. The unintended consequences of pesticides is one of the main drivers of the negative impact of modern industrial agriculture on the environment. Pesticides, because they are toxic chemicals meant to kill pest species, can affect non-target species, such as plants, animals and humans. Over 98% of sprayed insecticides and 95% of herbicides reach a destination other than their target species, because they are sprayed or spread across entire agricultural fields. Other agrochemicals, such as fertilizers, can also have negative effects on the environment.

The negative effects of pesticides are not just in the area of application. Runoff and pesticide drift can carry pesticides into distant aquatic environments or other fields, grazing areas, human settlements and undeveloped areas. Other problems emerge from poor production, transport, storage and disposal practices. Over time, repeat application of pesticides increases pest resistance, while its effects on other species can facilitate the pest's resurgence. Alternatives to heavy use of pesticides, such as integrated pest management, and sustainable agriculture techniques such as polyculture mitigate these consequences, without the harmful toxic chemical application.

Environmental modelling indicates that globally over 60% of global agricultural land (~24.5 million km²) is "at risk of pesticide pollution by more than one active ingredient", and that over 30% is at "high risk" of which a third are in high-biodiversity regions. Each pesticide or pesticide class comes with a specific set of environmental concerns. Such undesirable effects have led many pesticides to be banned, while regulations have limited and/or reduced the use of others. The global spread of pesticide use, including the use of older/obsolete pesticides that have been banned in some jurisdictions, has increased overall.

=== Plastics ===
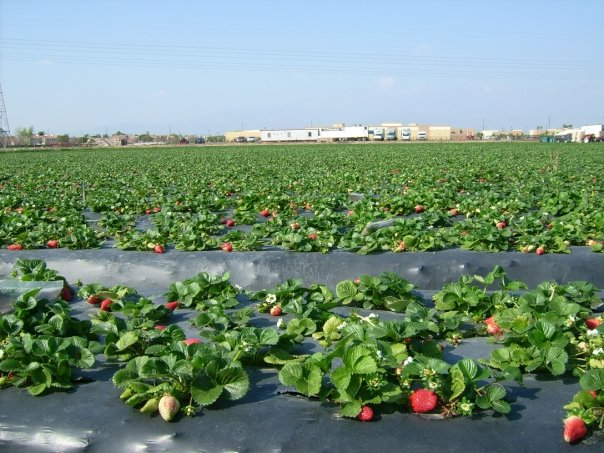
Plastic mulch used for growing strawberries

Plasticulture is the practice of using plastic materials in agricultural applications. The plastic materials themselves are often and broadly referred to as "ag plastics". Plasticulture ag plastics include soil fumigation film, irrigation drip tape/tubing, plastic plant packaging cord, nursery pots and bales, but the term is most often used to describe all kinds of plastic plant/soil coverings. Such coverings range from plastic mulch film, row coverings, high and low tunnels (polytunnels), to plastic greenhouses.

Plastic used in agriculture was expected to include 6.7 million tons of plastic in 2019 or 2% of global plastic production. Plastic used in agriculture is hard to recycle because of contamination by agricultural chemicals and soil. Moreover, plastic degradation into microplastics is damaging to soil health, microorganisms and beneficial organisms like earthworms. Current science is not clear if there are negative impacts on food or once food grown in plasticulture is eaten by humans. Because of these impacts, some governments, like the European Union under the Circular Economy Action Plan, are beginning to regulate its use and plastic waste produced on farms.

== By environmental issue ==
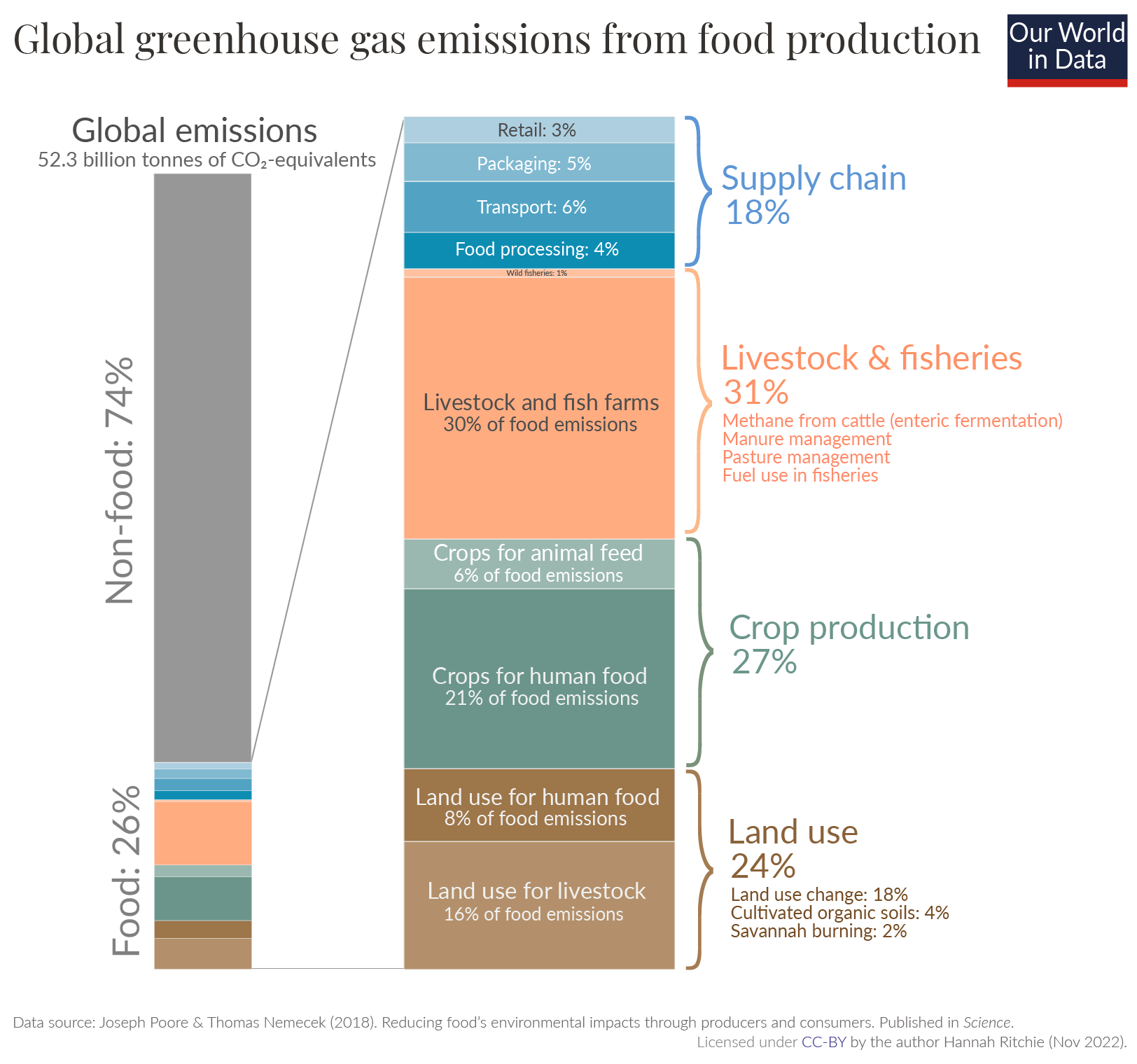
One quarter of the world's greenhouse gas emissions result from food and agriculture (data from 2019).

Greenhouse gas emissions from agriculture are large: the agriculture, forestry and land use sectors contribute between 13% and 21% of global greenhouse gas emissions. Direct greenhouse gas emissions include those from rice and livestock farming. Indirect emissions from the conversion of non-agricultural land such as forests into agricultural land are also very important. With regard to direct emissions, nitrous oxide and methane make up over half of total greenhouse gas emissions from agriculture. A 2023 review emphasizes that emissions from agricultural soils are shaped by factors such as soil type, climate, and management practices. It also highlights several mitigation strategies, including conservation tillage, precision agriculture, improved water use, and the application of biochar, that can reduce emissions and enhance soil carbon storage.

Furthermore, there is also fossil fuel consumption for transport and fertilizer production. For example, the manufacture and use of nitrogen fertilizer contributes around 5% of all global greenhouse gas emissions. Livestock farming is a major source of greenhouse gas emissions.

Farm animals' digestive systems can be put into two categories: monogastric and ruminant. Ruminant cattle for beef and dairy rank high in greenhouse gas emissions. In comparison, monogastric, or pigs and poultry-related foods, are lower. The consumption of the monogastric types may yield less emissions. Monogastric animals have a higher feed-conversion efficiency and also do not produce as much methane. Non-ruminant livestock, such as poultry, emit much less greenhouse gas.

There are many strategies to reduce greenhouse gas emissions from agriculture (this is one of the goals of climate-smart agriculture). Mitigation measures in the food system can be divided into four categories. These are demand-side changes, ecosystem protections, mitigation on farms, and mitigation in supply chains. On the demand side, limiting food waste is an effective way to reduce food emissions. Changes to a diet less reliant on animal products such as plant-based diets are also effective. This could include milk substitutes and meat alternatives. Several methods are also under investigation to reduce the greenhouse gas emissions from livestock farming. These include genetic selection, introduction of methanotrophic bacteria into the rumen, vaccines, feeds, diet modification and grazing management.

=== Deforestation ===
Deforestation is clearing the Earth's forests on a large scale worldwide and resulting in many land damages. One of the causes of deforestation is clearing land for pasture or crops. According to British environmentalist Norman Myers, 5% of deforestation is due to cattle ranching, 19% due to over-heavy logging, 22% due to the growing sector of palm oil plantations, and 54% due to slash-and-burn farming.

Deforestation causes the loss of habitat for millions of species, and is also a driver of climate change. Trees act as a carbon sink: that is, they absorb carbon dioxide, an unwanted greenhouse gas, out of the atmosphere. Removing trees releases carbon dioxide into the atmosphere and leaves behind fewer trees to absorb the increasing amount of carbon dioxide in the air. In this way, deforestation exacerbates climate change. When trees are removed from forests, the soils tend to dry out because there is no longer shade, and there are not enough trees to assist in the water cycle by returning water vapor back to the environment. With no trees, landscapes that were once forests can potentially become barren deserts. The tree's roots also help to hold the soil together, so when they are removed, mudslides can also occur. The removal of trees also causes extreme fluctuations in temperature.

In 2000 the United Nations Food and Agriculture Organisation (FAO) found that "the role of population dynamics in a local setting may vary from decisive to negligible," and that deforestation can result from "a combination of population pressure and stagnating economic, social and technological conditions."

=== Pollutants ===
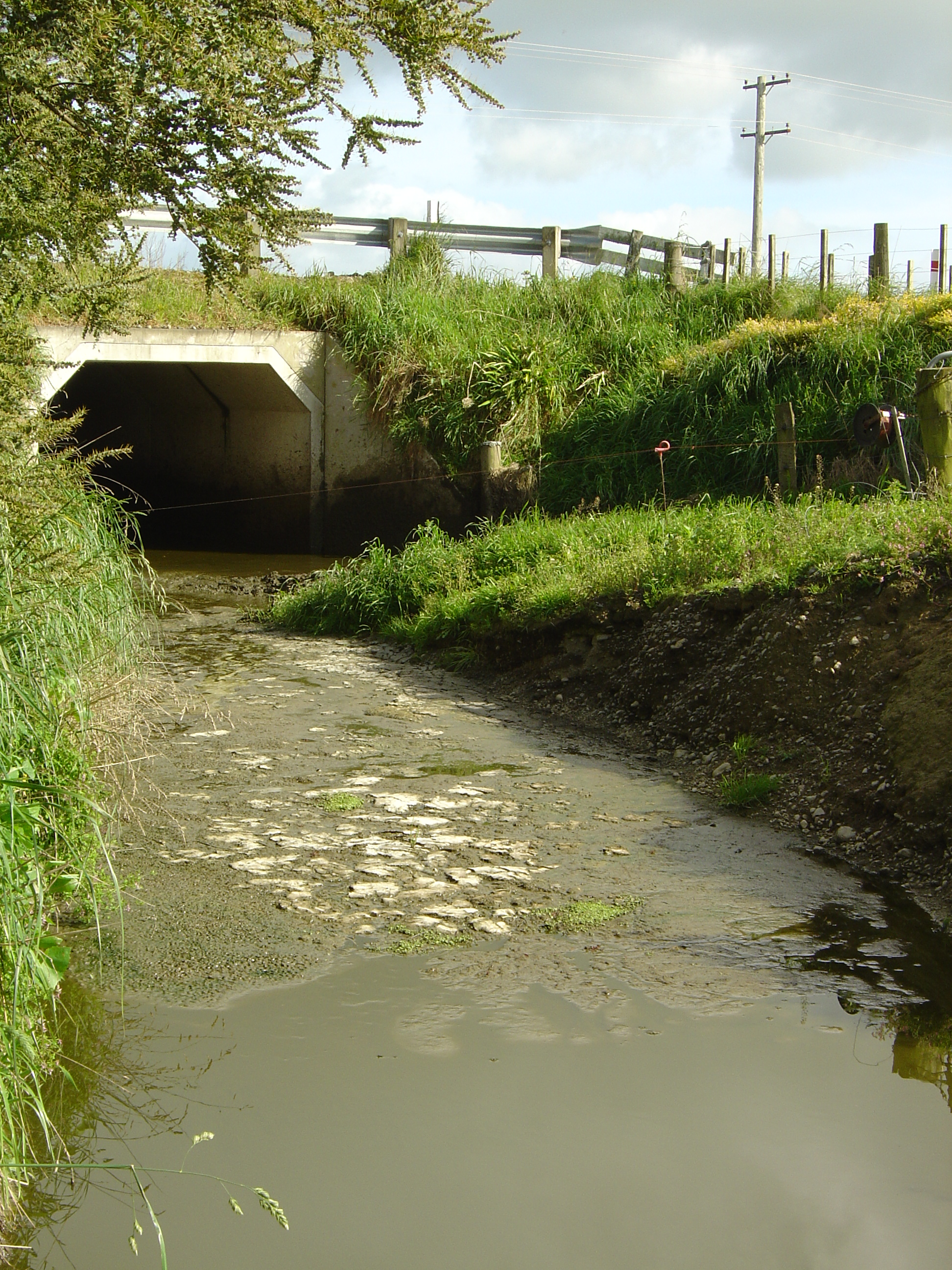
Water pollution due to dairy farming in the Wairarapa area of New Zealand (photographed in 2003)

Agricultural pollution problem refers to biotic and abiotic byproducts of farming practices that result in contamination or degradation of the environment and surrounding ecosystems, and/or cause injury to humans and their economic interests. The pollution may come from a variety of sources, ranging from point source water pollution (from a single discharge point) to more diffuse, landscape-level causes, also known as non-point source pollution and air pollution. Once in the environment these pollutants can have both direct effects in surrounding ecosystems, e.g. killing local wildlife or contaminating drinking water, and downstream effects such as dead zones caused by agricultural runoff is concentrated in large water bodies.

Management practices, or ignorance of them, play a crucial role in the amount and impact of these pollutants. Management techniques range from animal management and housing to the spread of pesticides and fertilizers in global agricultural practices, which can have major environmental impacts. Bad management practices include poorly managed animal feeding operations, overgrazing, plowing, fertilizer, and improper, excessive, or badly timed use of pesticides.

Pollutants from agriculture greatly affect water quality and can be found in lakes, rivers, wetlands, estuaries, and groundwater. Pollutants from farming include sediments, nutrients, pathogens, pesticides, metals, and salts. Animal agriculture has an outsized impact on pollutants that enter the environment. Bacteria and pathogens in manure can make their way into streams and groundwater if grazing, storing manure in lagoons and applying manure to fields is not properly managed. Air pollution caused by agriculture through land use changes and animal agriculture practices have an outsized impact on climate change. Addressing these concerns was a central part of the IPCC Special Report on Climate Change and Land as well as in the 2024 UNEP Actions on Air Quality report. Mitigation of agricultural pollution is a key component in the development of a sustainable food system.

=== Soil degradation ===
World farm-gate greenhouse gas emissions by activity

Soil degradation is the decline in soil quality that can be a result of many factors, especially from agriculture. Soils hold the majority of the world's biodiversity, and healthy soils are essential for food production and adequate water supply. Common attributes of soil degradation can be salting, waterlogging, compaction, pesticide contamination, a decline in soil structure quality, loss of fertility, changes in soil acidity, alkalinity, salinity, and erosion. Soil erosion is the wearing away of topsoil by water, wind, or farming activities. Topsoil is very fertile, which makes it valuable to farmers growing crops. Soil degradation also has a huge impact on biological degradation, which affects the microbial community of the soil and can alter nutrient cycling, pest and disease control, and chemical transformation properties of the soil.

=== Soil erosion ===
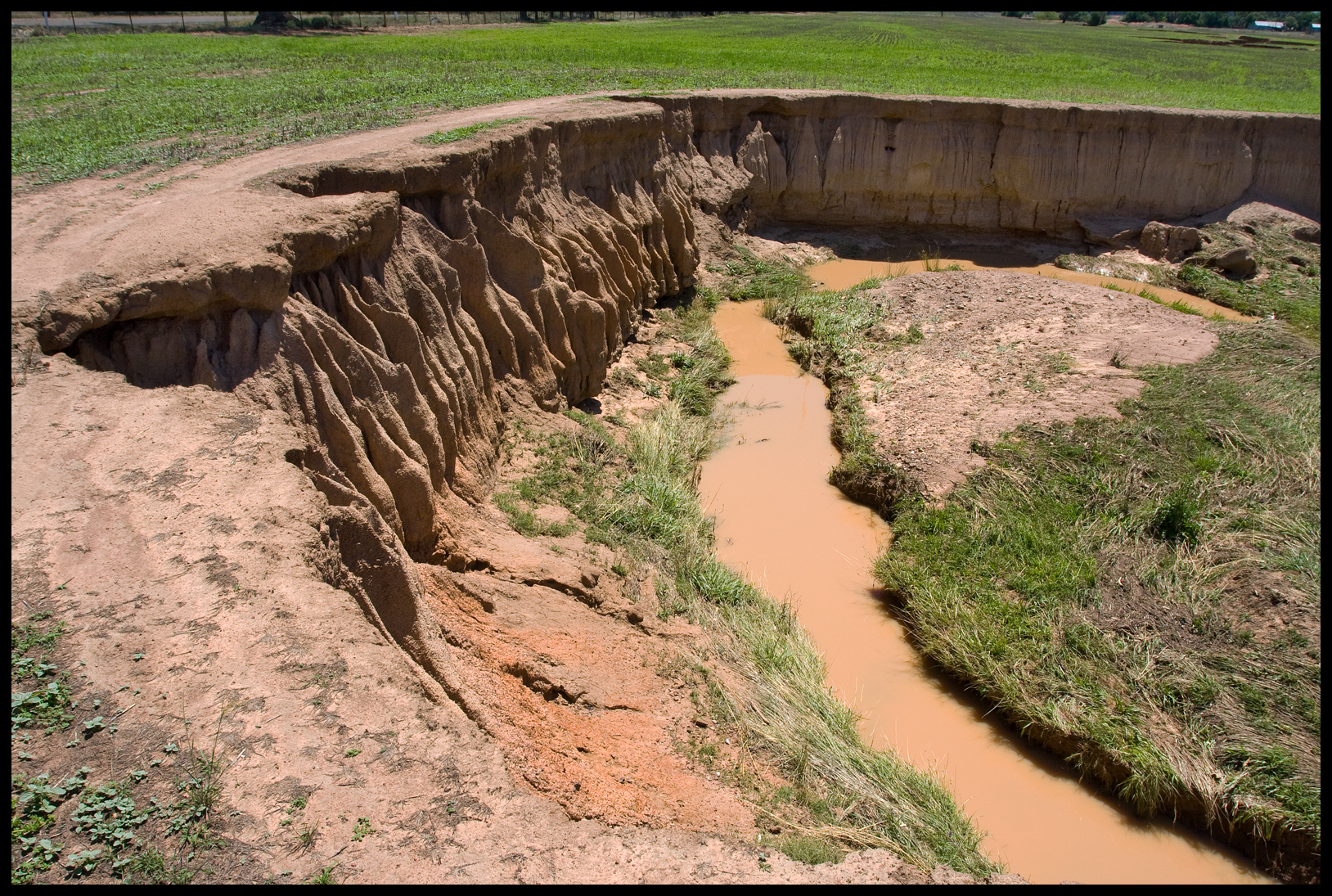
An example of drastic soil erosion as a result of agriculture

Large scale farming can cause large amounts of soil erosion. 25 to 40 percent of eroded soil ends up in water sources. Soil that carries pesticides and fertilizers pollutes the bodies of water it enters. In the United States and Europe especially, large-scale agriculture has grown and small-scale-agriculture has shrunk due to financial arrangements such as contract farming. Bigger farms tend to favour monocultures, overuse water resources, and accelerate deforestation and soil quality decline. A study from 2020 by the International Land Coalition, together with Oxfam and World Inequality Lab, found that 1% of land owners manage 70% of the world's farmland. The highest discrepancy can be found in Latin America, where the poorest 50% own just 1% of the land. Small landowners, as individuals or families, tend to be more cautious in land use compared to large landowners. As of 2020, however, the proportion of small landowners has been decreasing since the 1980s. Currently, the largest share of smallholdings can be found in Asia and Africa.

==== Tillage erosion ====
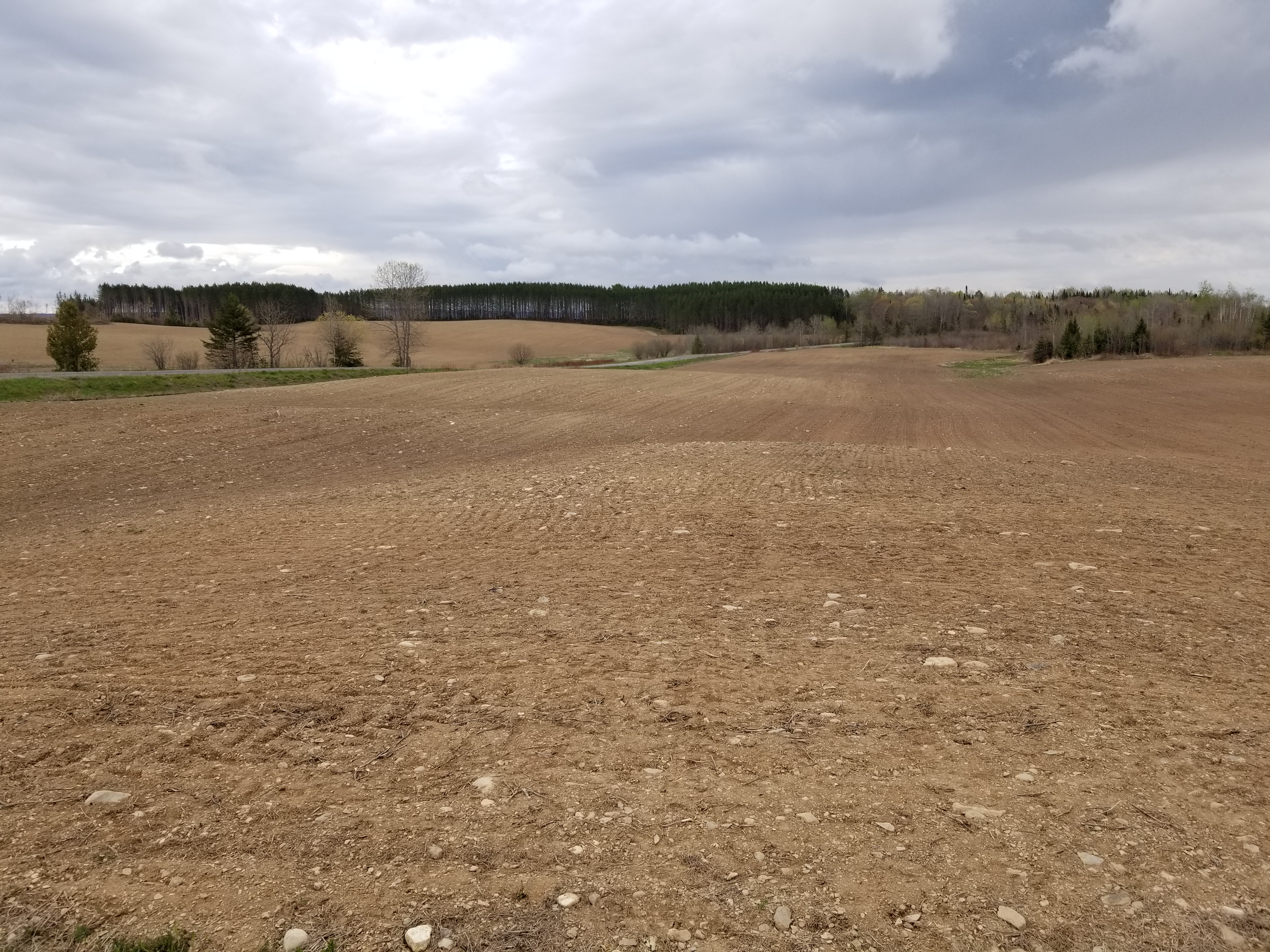
Eroded hilltops due to tillage erosion

Tillage erosion is a form of soil erosion occurring in cultivated fields due to the movement of soil by tillage. There is growing evidence that tillage erosion is a major soil erosion process in agricultural lands, surpassing water and wind erosion in many fields all around the world, especially on sloping and hilly lands. A signature spatial pattern of soil erosion shown in many water erosion handbooks and pamphlets, the eroded hilltops, is actually caused by tillage erosion as water erosion mainly causes soil losses in the midslope and lowerslope segments of a slope, not the hilltops. Tillage erosion results in soil degradation, which can lead to significant reduction in crop yield and, therefore, economic losses for the farm.

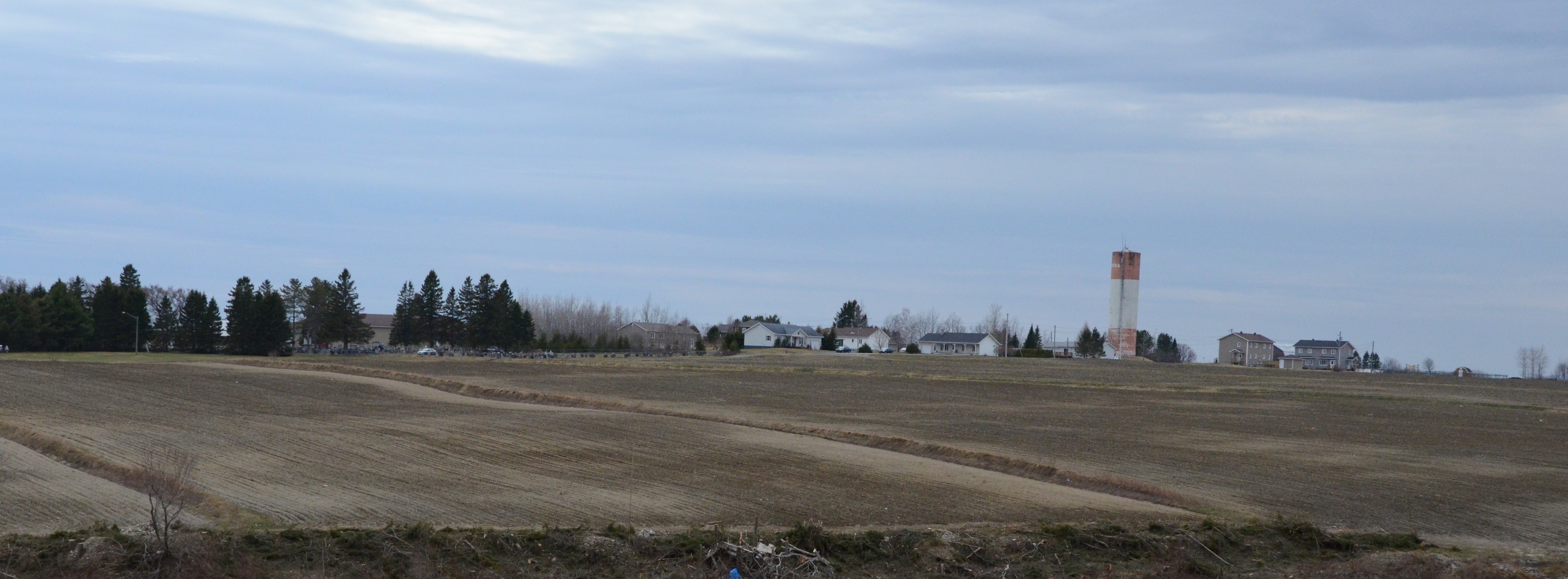
Tillage erosion in field with diversion terraces

=== Waste ===
Plasticulture is the use of plastic mulch in agriculture. Farmers use plastic sheets as mulch to cover 50-70% of the soil and allow them to use drip irrigation systems to have better control over soil nutrients and moisture. Rain is not required in this system, and farms that use plasticulture are built to encourage the fastest runoff of rain. The use of pesticides with plasticulture allows pesticides to be transported easier in the surface runoff towards wetlands or tidal creeks. The runoff from pesticides and chemicals in the plastic can cause serious deformations and death in shellfish as the runoff carries the chemicals toward the oceans.

In addition to the increased runoff that results from plasticulture, there is also the problem of the increased amount of waste from the plastic mulch itself. The use of plastic mulch for vegetables, strawberries, and other row and orchard crops exceeds 110 million pounds annually in the United States. Most plastic ends up in the landfill, although there are other disposal options such as disking mulches into the soil, on-site burying, on-site storage, reuse, recycling, and incineration. The incineration and recycling options are complicated by the variety of the types of plastics that are used and by the geographic dispersal of the plastics. Plastics also contain stabilizers and dyes as well as heavy metals, which limits the number of products that can be recycled. Research is continually being conducted on creating biodegradable or photodegradable mulches. While there has been a minor success with this, there is also the problem of how long the plastic takes to degrade, as many biodegradable products take a long time to break down.

=== Issues by region ===
The environmental impact of agriculture can vary depending on the region as well as the type of agriculture production method that is being used. Listed below are some specific environmental issues in various different regions around the world.

- Hedgerow removal in the United Kingdom.
- Soil salinisation, especially in Australia.
- Phosphate mining in Nauru
- Methane emissions from livestock in New Zealand. See Climate change in New Zealand.
- Environmentalists attribute the hypoxic zone in the Gulf of Mexico as being encouraged by nitrogen fertilization of the algae bloom.
- Coupled systems from agricultural trade leading to regional effects from cascading effects and spillover systems. Environmental factor (Socioeconomic Drivers Section)

== Sustainable agriculture ==
Sustainable agriculture is the idea that agriculture should occur in a way such that production can be continued to produce necessary products without infringing on the ability for future generations to do the same.

The exponential population increase in recent decades has increased the practice of agricultural land conversion to meet the demand for food which in turn has increased the effects on the environment. The global population is still increasing and will eventually stabilize, as some critics doubt that food production, due to lower yields from global warming, can support the global population.

Agriculture can have negative effects on biodiversity as well. Organic farming is a multifaceted sustainable agriculture set of practices that can have a lower impact on the environment at a small scale. However, in most cases organic farming results in lower yields in terms of production per unit area. Therefore, widespread adoption of organic agriculture will require additional land to be cleared and water resources extracted to meet the same level of production. A European meta-analysis found that organic farms tended to have higher soil organic matter content and lower nutrient losses (nitrogen leaching, nitrous oxide emissions, and ammonia emissions) per unit of field area but higher ammonia emissions, nitrogen leaching and nitrous oxide emissions per product unit. It is believed by many that conventional farming systems cause less rich biodiversity than organic systems. Organic farming has shown to have on average 30% higher species richness than conventional farming. Organic systems on average also have 50% more organisms. However, these results do not account for possible loss of biodiversity due to decreased yields because more land is needed.

=== Regenerative agriculture ===
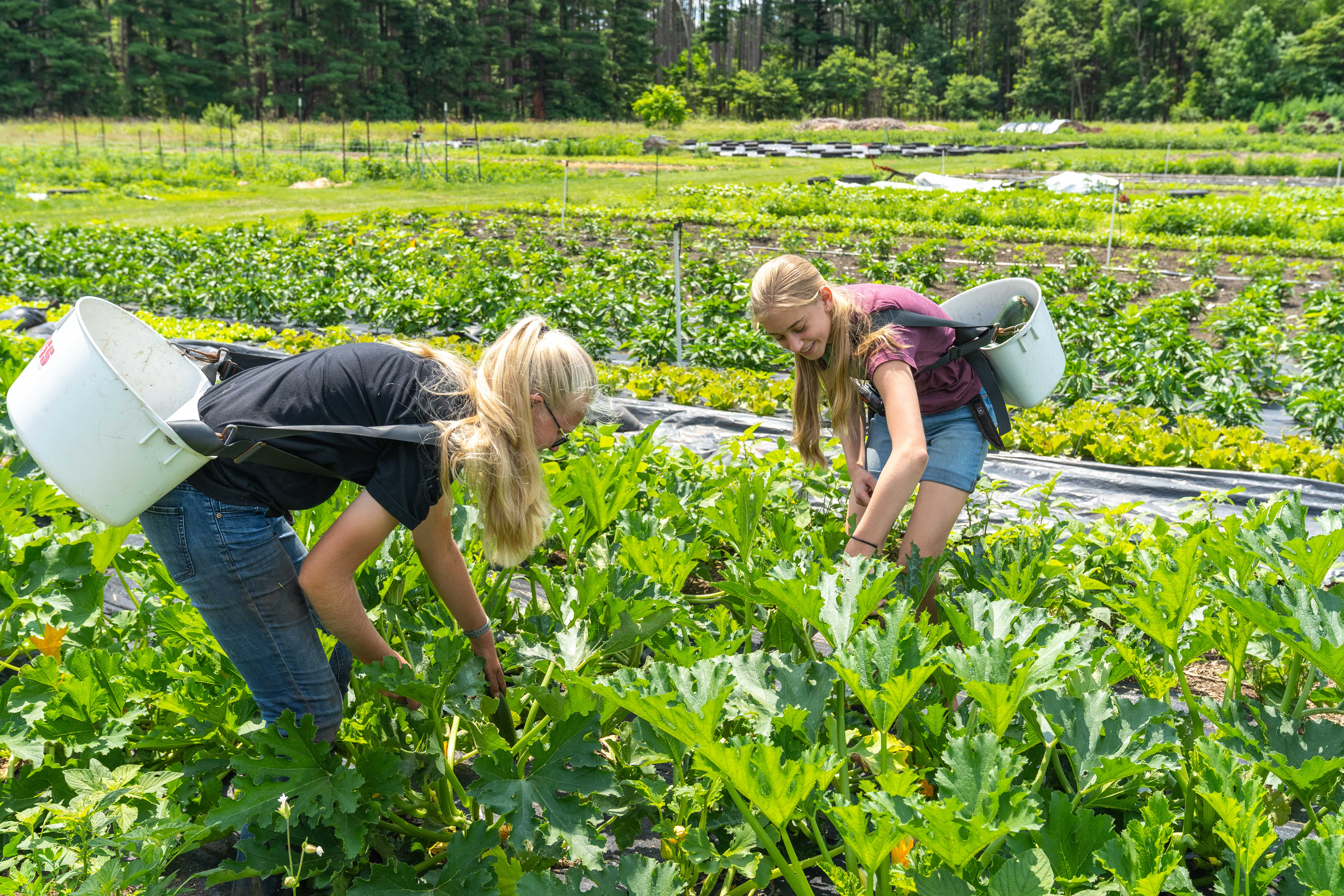
Regenerative agriculture

Regenerative agriculture is a conservation and rehabilitation approach to food and farming systems. It focuses on topsoil regeneration, increasing biodiversity, enhancing ecosystem services, supporting biosequestration, increasing resilience to climate change, and strengthening the health and vitality of farm soil.

Regenerative agriculture is not a specific practice. It combines a variety of sustainable agriculture techniques. Practices include maximal recycling of farm waste and adding composted material from non-farm sources.

Regenerative agriculture claims to mitigate climate change through carbon dioxide removal from the atmosphere and sequestration. Carbon sequestration is gaining popularity in agriculture from individuals as well as groups. However, such claims have also been subject to criticism by scientists.

=== Techniques ===
==== Conservation tillage ====
Conservation tillage is an alternative tillage method for farming which is more sustainable for the soil and surrounding ecosystem. This is done by allowing the residue of the previous harvest's crops to remain in the soil before tilling for the next crop. Conservation tillage has shown to improve many things such as soil moisture retention, and reduce erosion. Some disadvantages are the fact that more expensive equipment is needed for this process, more pesticides will need to be used, and the positive effects take a long time to be visible. The barriers of instantiating a conservation tillage policy are that farmers are reluctant to change their methods, and would protest a more expensive, and time-consuming method of tillage than the conventional one they are used to.

==== Biological pest control ====
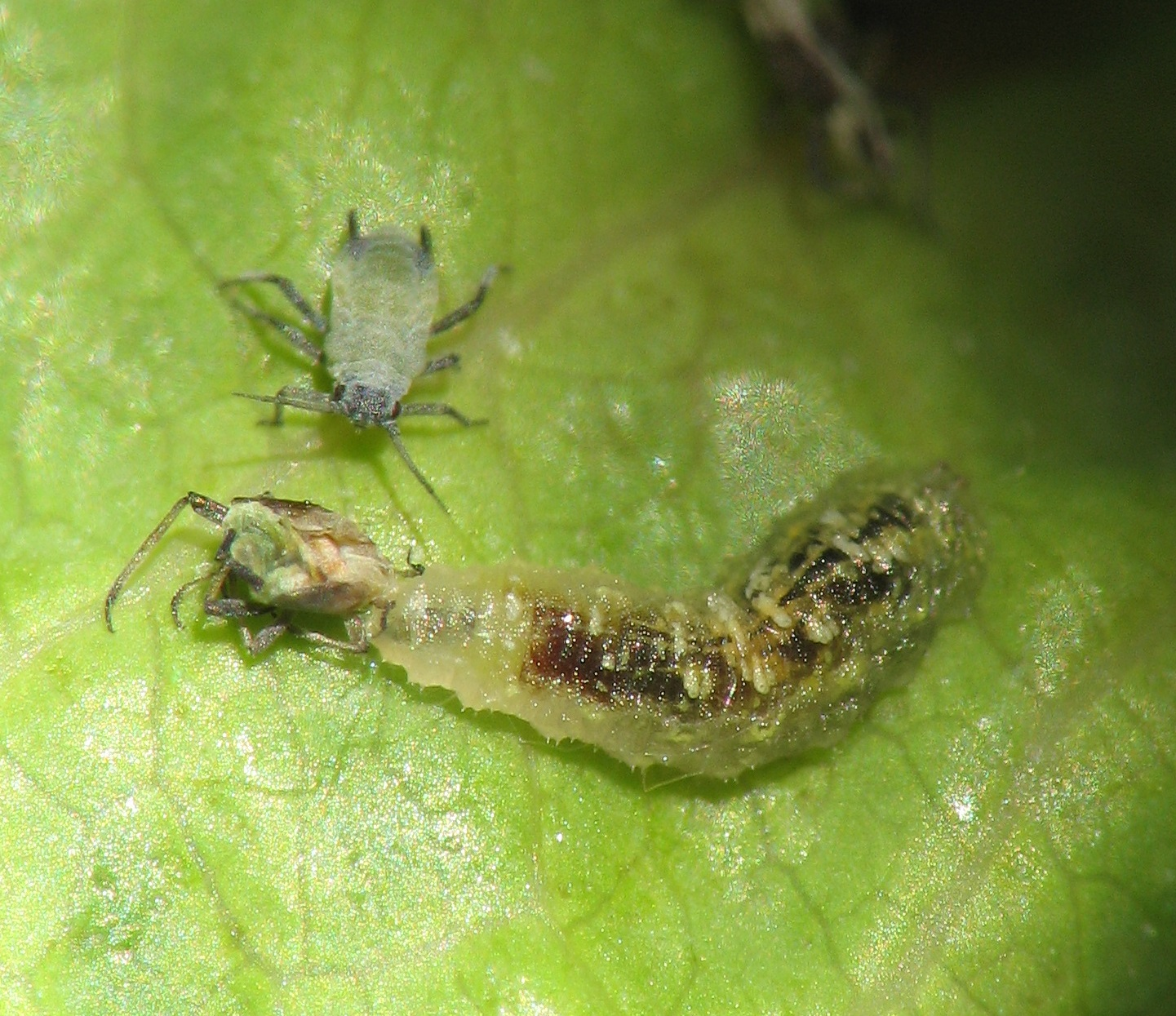
Syrphus hoverfly larva (below) feed on aphids (above), making them natural biological control agents.

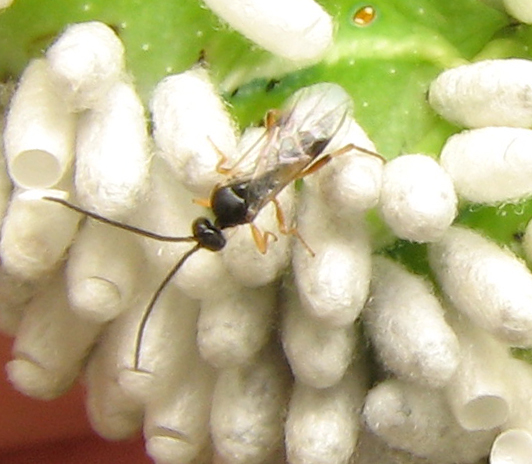
A parasitoid wasp (Cotesia congregata) adult with pupal cocoons on its host, a tobacco hornworm (Manduca sexta, green background), an example of a hymenopteran biological control agent

Biological control or biocontrol is a method of controlling pests, whether animals, weed plants, or pathogens of animals or of plants by using other organisms. It relies on predation, parasitism, and herbivory, but typically involves an active human management role. It can be a component of integrated pest management (IPM) programs. Invertebrates and other macroorganisms are registered as biological control agents by the authorities in the US and Europe very differently from microorganisms, which are registered as biopesticides.

There are three basic strategies for biological control: classical (importation), where a natural enemy of a pest is introduced in the hope of achieving control; inductive (augmentation), in which a large population of natural enemies are administered for quick pest control; and inoculative (conservation), in which measures are taken to maintain natural enemies through regular reestablishment.

Natural enemies of insects play an important part in limiting the densities of potential pests. Biological control agents such as these include predators, parasitoids, pathogens, and competitors. Biological control agents of plant diseases are most often referred to as antagonists. Biological control agents of weeds include seed predators, herbivores, and plant pathogens.

Biological control can have side-effects on biodiversity through attacks on non-target species by any of the above mechanisms, especially when a species is introduced without a thorough understanding of the possible consequences.

== See also ==
- Agroecology
- Agricultural pollution
- Agro-hydro-salinity model (for environmental impacts of irrigated agriculture)
- Cultured meat
- Digital Product Passport
- Ethical eating
- Fermentation
- Meat analogue
- Environmental effects of soybean imports to EU
- Single cell protein
- Stranded assets in the agriculture and forestry sector
- Concentrated animal feeding operations
- List of environmental issues
- Habitat
- Holistic management
- Livestock's Long Shadow – Environmental Issues and Options

Report by the Food and Agriculture Organization of the United Nations

- Principles of Organic Agriculture
- Research Institute for Organic Agriculture
- Stock-free agriculture
- Tillage erosion
