= Microtubing =

Fine plastic tubing used in drip irrigation gardening

Microtubing or spaghetti tubing is a very fine plastic tubing used in drip irrigation, typically in gardens and greenhouses, with a small inside diameter which may be 0.05" or smaller.

It was introduced in the 1950s in the United States, in Watertown, New York. By the 1960s, most greenhouse research and commercial operations used the drip pipe system with plastic mulch.

Microtubing is inserted directly into the supply tubing, usually without any fittings. The flow is regulated by the inside diameter of the tube and the length of tubing used. The smaller the diameter and the longer the tube, the greater the friction loss, thus reducing the pressure and flow. The end of the tube may have a plastic or lead weight to hold the tube in a pot.

Microtubing is one of the oldest products made for drip irrigation, having been manufactured for about fifty years. It has largely been replaced by other drip irrigation products such as emitters, microsprinklers, and drip tape.

The system can be compromised, as the larvae of selenisa sueroides (owlet moth) has damaged a system in the citrus groves of south Florida. The caterpillars of the moth had munched holes in the plastic tubing to penetrate the pipes and then pupate. They seemed to prefer black tubing compared to coloured tubing. It has also been found that the roots of some of the crop can go into the tubing.

== See also ==
- Micro-irrigation
