= Kodungallur Pottuvellari =

Snap melon variety from Kerala, India

Kodungallur Pottuvellari (Malayalam: കൊടുങ്ങല്ലൂർ പൊട്ടുവെള്ളരി), also called the Kodungallur snap melon, is a landrace of snap melon (Cucumis melo var. momordica) grown in and around Kodungallur in the Thrissur and Ernakulam districts of the Indian state of Kerala. The fruit is grown mainly for its juice, which is prepared by mashing the ripe pulp with jaggery. Its Malayalam name derives from pottu, meaning to crack, because the fruit splits open on its own when it ripens. In 2022 it was granted a geographical indication tag under the Geographical Indications of Goods (Registration and Protection) Act, 1999.

== Description ==
The plant is a monoecious annual vine of the gourd family that completes its crop cycle in about 75 to 80 days. The fruit is cylindrical and elongated, measuring roughly 30 to 45 cm in length and 32 to 43 cm in girth, and weighs between 1.5 and 3.0 kg. At the marketable stage the skin is creamy white to light yellow, slightly hairy with a white powdery bloom, and lacks the ribs, sutures and stripes seen in many other melons. The flesh is spongy and creamy white, which makes it different from other snap melon cultivars. The fruit is about 90 per cent water and gives off a sweet smell when it cracks at ripeness. It is also known locally as kakkari and palayilpilla.

== Cultivation ==
The melon is grown in the rice fallows of the coastal belt, mostly after the second paddy crop. Sowing is done around January, and the fruit is ready to harvest in about 45 days. Traditional cultivation is concentrated in Kodungallur and neighbouring parts of Thrissur, and it has since spread to areas such as Mala and Nedumbassery in Ernakulam district, where farmers have raised the crop on laterite soils using plastic mulching, drip irrigation and fertigation. A 2026 study of the crop's marketing surveya of farmers across the geographical indication area in Thrissur and Ernakulam and reported that short shelf life, price fluctuation and transport difficulties were among the main constraints faced by growers.

== Culinary use ==
The ripe fruit is used chiefly to make a summer drink, made by mashing the pulp with jaggery; variants blend it with coconut milk or cow's milk. The juice is sold from roadside stalls along the highway between Chavakkad and Kochi during the season. Tender fruits are occasionally eaten as a salad or cooked as a vegetable.

== Geographical indication ==
The application for geographical indication protection was filed on 19 April 2021 by the Kodungallur Pottuvellari Karshaka Kshema Vikasana Samithi and the Pottuvellari Ulppadaka Sangham, Alangad. The tag was registered under class 31 (agricultural goods), with the certificate issued on 30 November 2022. It was one of five Kerala farm products granted the tag in December 2022, the others being Attappady Attukombu Avara, Attappady Thuvara, Onattukara Ellu and Kanthalloor-Vattavada Veluthulli.
