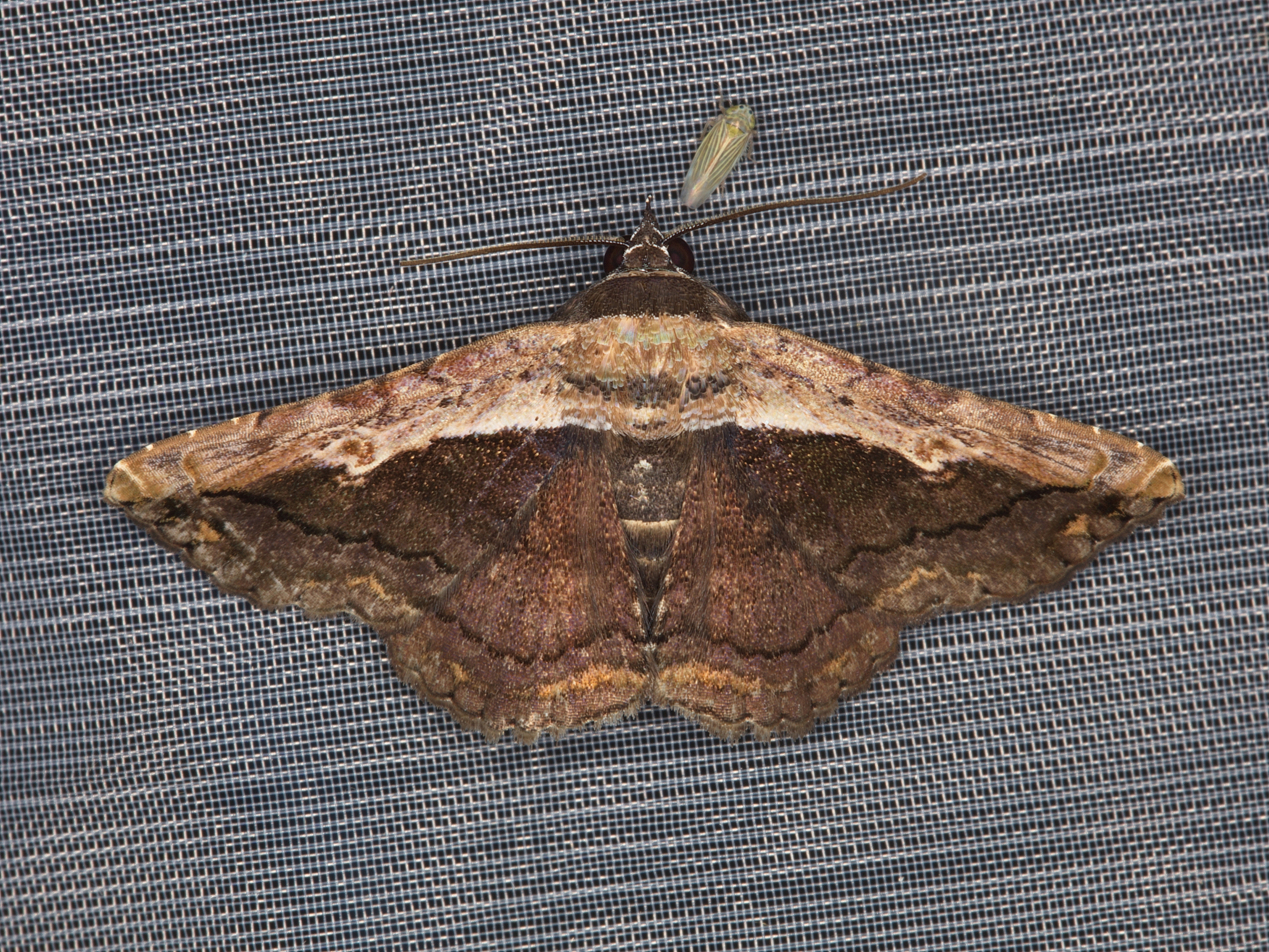
- Selenisa sueroides

Scientific classification
- Domain: Eukaryota
- Kingdom: Animalia
- Phylum: Arthropoda
- Class: Insecta
- Order: Lepidoptera
- Superfamily: Noctuoidea
- Family: Erebidae
- Tribe: Omopterini
- Genus: Selenisa; Hayward, 1967

Synonyms
- Selenis Guenée, 1852

= Selenisa =

Genus of moths

Selenisa is a genus of moths in the family Erebidae.

== Species ==
- Selenisa affulgens (Saalmüller 1881)
- Selenisa humeralis (Walker 1858)
- Selenisa lanipes (Guenée 1852)
- Selenisa macarioides (Moschler 1880)
- Selenisa monogonia (Hampson 1926)
- Selenisa portoricensis (Moschler 1890)
- Selenisa projiciens (Hampson 1926)
- Selenisa specifica (Moschler 1880)
- Selenisa stipata (Walker 1865)
- Selenisa suero (Cramer 1777);
- Selenisa sueroides (Guenée 1852) – pale-edged selenisa moth
- Selenisa vittata (Maassen 1890)
