= Plasticulture =

Use of plastic materials in agriculture

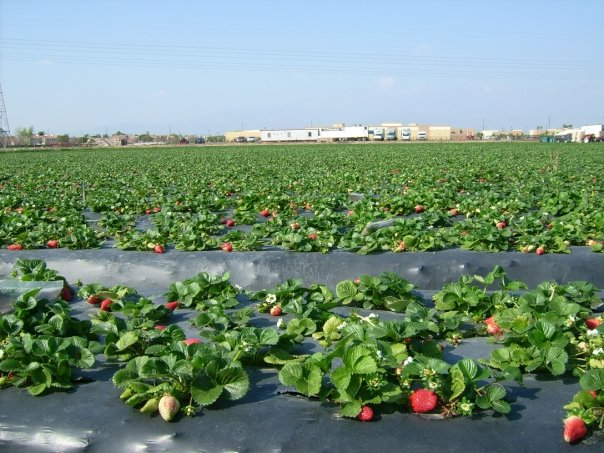
Plastic mulch used for growing strawberries

Plasticulture is the practice of using plastic materials in agricultural applications. The plastic materials themselves are often and broadly referred to as "ag plastics". Plasticulture ag plastics include soil fumigation film, irrigation drip tape/tubing, plastic plant packaging cord, nursery pots and bales, but the term is most often used to describe all kinds of plastic plant/soil coverings. Such coverings range from plastic mulch film, row coverings, high and low tunnels (polytunnels), to plastic greenhouses.

Plastic used in agriculture was expected to include 6.7 million tons of plastic in 2019 or 2% of global plastic production. Plastic used in agriculture is hard to recycle because of contamination by agricultural chemicals and soil. Moreover, plastic degradation into microplastics is damaging to soil health, microorganisms and beneficial organisms like earthworms. Current science is not clear if there are negative impacts on food or once food grown in plasticulture is eaten by humans. Because of these impacts, some governments, like the European Union under the Circular Economy Action Plan, are beginning to regulate its use and plastic waste produced on farms.

== Types of plastics used ==
Polyethylene (PE) is the plastic film used by the majority of growers because of its affordability, flexibility and easy manufacturing. It comes in a variety of thicknesses, such as a low density form (LDPE) as well as a linear low density form (LLDPE). These can be modified by addition of certain elements to the plastic that give it properties beneficial to plant growth such as reduced water loss, UV stabilization to cool soil and prevent insects, elimination of photosynthetically active radiation to prevent weed growth, IR opacity, antidrip/antifog, and fluorescence.

Polypropylene (PP) is often used for agricultural plant packaging cord.

== Applications ==
=== Greenhouses and walk-in tunnel covers ===
A greenhouse is a large structure in which it is possible to stand and work with automated ventilation. High tunnels are hoop houses, manually ventilated by rolling up the sides. Greenhouse and high tunnel films are usually within the parameters of 80-220μm thick and 20m wide, and have a life span between 6–45 months dependent on several factors. Monolayer polyethylene films are better suited for less extreme environmental conditions, while multilayer covers made of three layers, one EVA19 layer inserted between two low-density polyethylene layers has been shown to have a better performance under harsh conditions. Other plastic materials sometimes used in greenhouse construction include polycarbonate and PMMA acrylic glass.

=== Small tunnel covers ===
Small tunnel covers are about 1m wide and 1m high, and have a thinner polyethylene film than the large tunnel covers, usually below 80μm. Their lifetime is also shorter than that of the larger versions; they usually have a usable life span of 6–8 months. Use of small tunnels is less popular than both the more expensive but durable greenhouses/walk-in tunnels and the cheaper plastic mulch.

=== Plastic mulch ===
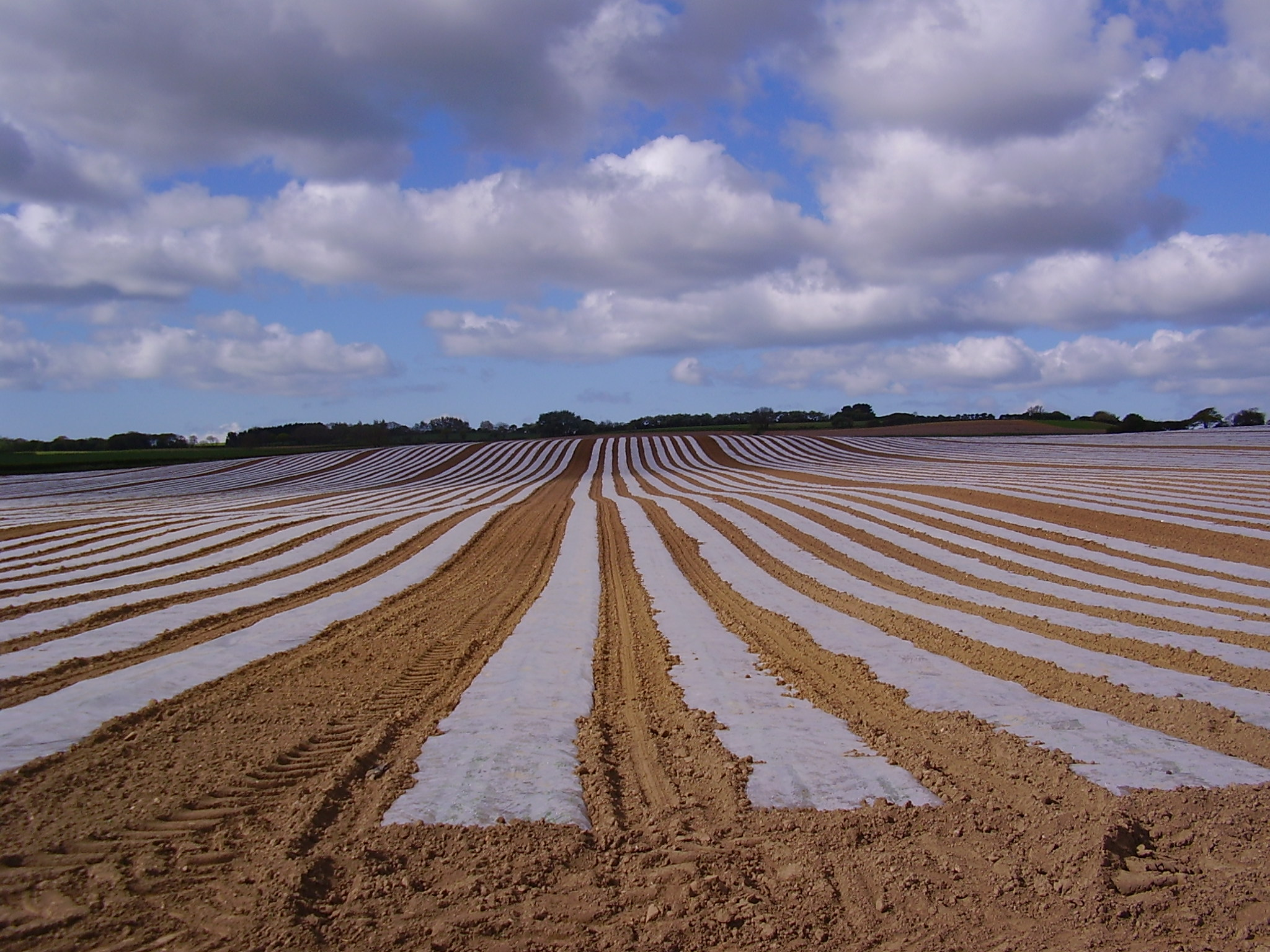
Plastic mulch in a field near Merstone, Isle of Wight, UK

Plastic mulching is when a thin plastic film is placed over the ground, poking holes at regular intervals for seeds to be planted in, or placing it directly over plants in the beginning stages of growth. The films remain in place for the duration of the cultivation (usually 2–4 months) and usually have a thickness of 12-80μm. The main functions of plastic mulch are to insulate and maintain a consistent temperature and humidity of the soil, preventing evaporation of moisture from the soil, minimization of seedtime and harvest, prevent weed growth, and to prevent erosion. Pigmented or colourless films can be used, each with specific advantages and disadvantages over the other.

Black films prevent weed growth, but do not transmit light to heat up the soil; clear films transmit light and heat the soil, but promote weed growth. Photosensitive films have been developed that are pigmented to prevent weed growth, but still transmit light to heat the soil. These photosensitive films are more costly than either the clear or black polyethylene sheeting. Black plastic mulch controls evaporation from the soil and improves soil water retention. Plastic mulching proved to reduce irrigation requirements in pepper by 14-29% because of elimination of soil evaporation.

Flowering time was also reduced in okra when black plastic mulch was used; the plants reached 50% flowering 3–6 days earlier than un-mulched plots. Plant height in okra was significantly increased with black plastic mulch use compared to those grown in bare soil. Evaporation from soil accounts for 25-50% of water used in irrigation, using plastic mulch prevents much of this evaporation and thus reduces the amount of water needed to grow the crop. This conservation of water makes plastic mulch favourable for farmers in dry and arid climates where water is a limited resource. As the second most used ag plastic in the world, the volume of plastic mulch used every year is estimated at 700,000t.

== Origins and development around the world ==
The first use of plastic film in agriculture was in an effort to make a cheaper version of a glasshouse. In 1948 Professor E.M. Emmert built the first plastic greenhouse, a wooden structure covered with cellulose acetate film. He later switched this to a more effective polyethylene film. After this introduction of plastic film to agriculture it began being used at a larger scale around the world by the early 1950s to replace paper for mulching vegetables.

By 1999 almost 30 million acres worldwide were covered in plastic mulch. Only a small percentage of this was in the United States (185 000 acres), the majority of this plastic growth was happening in economically poor areas of the world and previously unproductive desert regions, such as Almeria in southern Spain.

The largest concentrations of greenhouses around the world are mainly found in two areas, with 80% throughout the Far East (China, Japan, Korea), and 15% in the Mediterranean basin. The area of greenhouse cover is still increasing at a fast rate, during the last decade it is estimated that it has been growing by 20% every year. Areas such as the Middle East and Africa are growing in their use of plastic greenhouses by 15-20% per year, compared to the weak growth in more developed and economically stable areas such as Europe. China leads the world's growth at 30% per year, translating into a volume of plastic film reaching 1,000,000 t/year. In 2006 80% of the area covered by plastic mulch is found in China where it has a growth rate of 25% per year; this is the highest in the world.

Since its introduction in the 1950s, plastic film has been designed and developed to increase produce yield, increase produce size and shorten growth time. Developments in plastic film include durability, optical (ultraviolet, visible, near infrared, and middle infrared) properties, and the antidrip or antifog effect. Recent developments in this area include UV-blocking, NIR-blocking, fluorescent, and ultrathermic films.

=== Large-scale usage in southern Spain ===
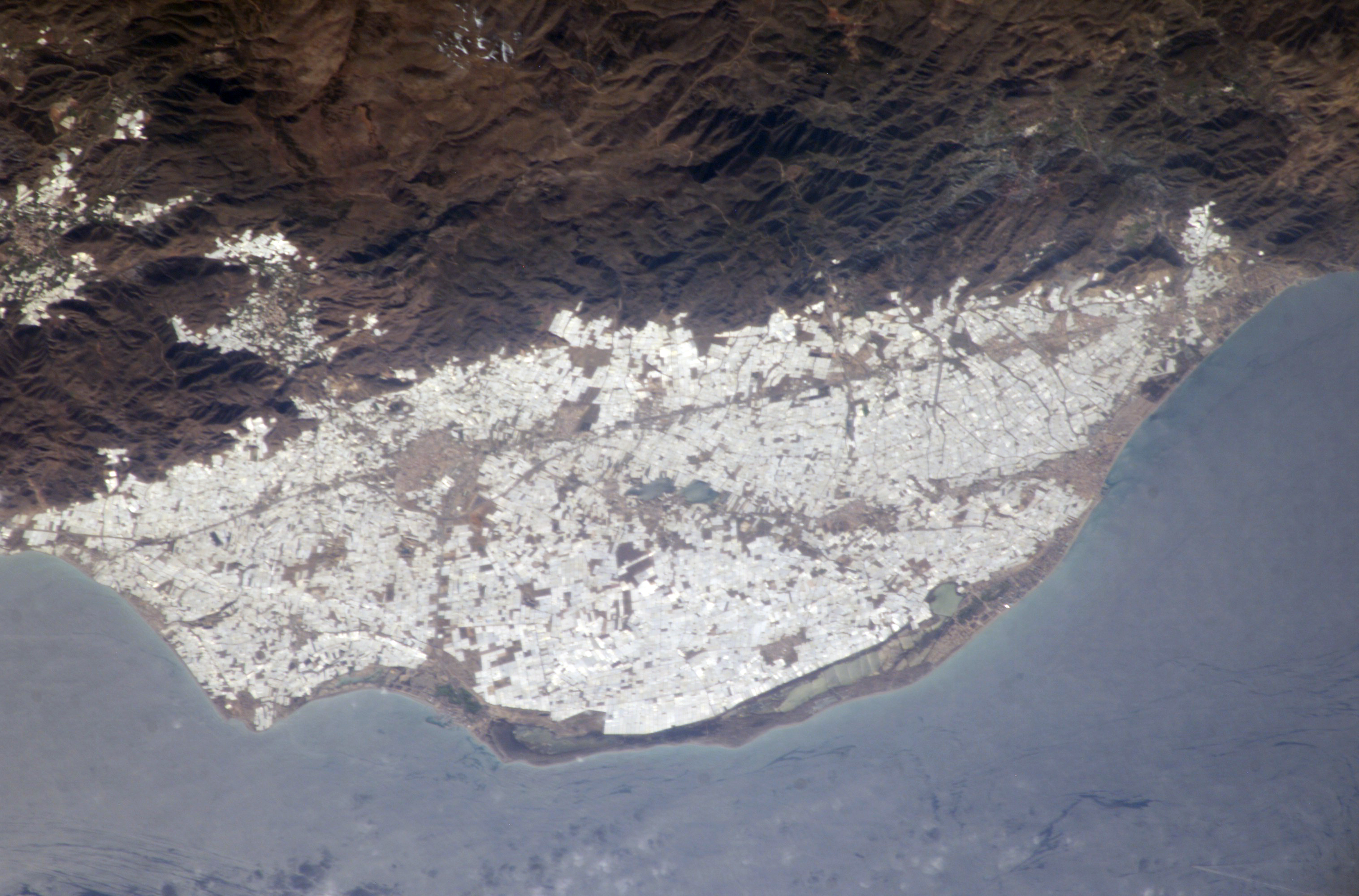
The "sea of plastic" covering 20,000 ha of the Campo de Dalías around El Ejido and Roquetas de Mar in southern Spain

The use of plasticulture in agriculture is growing rapidly, perhaps nowhere more visibly than around Almería in southern Spain. The eastern approaches to Almería, north of the airport, are densely covered, as is a large area further northeast, surrounding the towns of Campohermoso, Los Pipaces and Los Grillos (close to Níjar).

The densest concentration lies about 20 km southwest of Almería, where almost the entire Campo de Dalías, a low-lying cape, is now under plastic (an estimated area of 20,000 hectares). Further west, a similar, but smaller, coastal plain around Carchuna, southeast of Motril, is similarly enveloped. The technique is not restricted to the plains; it is also applied to wide terraces on the sides of shallow valleys, as the valley north of Castell de Ferro shows.

Recent studies have shown that this large-scale use of plastic mulch and greenhouse film in Almería has contributed to rising levels of microplastic contamination in surrounding soils and water systems, potentially affecting soil fertility and nearby marine ecosystems.

Elsewhere along the Costa Tropical and the Costa del Sol, particularly between Almería and Málaga, fruit trees growing on terraces in steeper valleys may be covered with vast tents of plastic netting.

== Environmental aspects ==
As (non-biodegradable) plastics are used in agriculture, there is a risk of it ending up in the soil, thus polluting it in the process.

=== Recycling ===
One significant component of plasticulture is the disposal of used ag plastics. Technologies exist which allow for ag plastics to be recycled into plastic resins for reuse in the plastics manufacturing industry.

Recycling of plastic mulch is difficult because the mulch is often wet or dirty. Thin mulch breaks down quickly, and can be impossible to pick up for recycling once degraded.

== Legislation on plastic use in agriculture ==
In the European Union, Directive 2008/98/EC on waste management is in place, of which article 8 states "each member state may introduce the ERP concept into its own legal framework in addition to deciding how to encourage manufacturers to participate in the prevention, re-use, recycling and recovery of used plastic products." In addition, in 2018, the European Commission published a communication laying out a strategy for plastics in a circular economy. It mentioned curbing plastic waste and littering, for instance by reducing single-use plastics, tackling sources of marine litter at sea, restricting the use of oxo-degradable plastics and curbing micro-plastics pollution. In 2020, the EU finally released its Circular Economy Action Plan. It included a set of measures to reduce plastic litter and address the presence of microplastics in the environment. It also expressed addressing sustainability issues by developing a policy framework on biodegradable or compostable plastics.

== See also ==
- Bioplastics
- Environmental impact of agriculture
- Soil contamination
- Cleanup options for contaminated soil
- Plastic pollution
- Plastisphere
