= Selenisa affulgens =

Scientific classification
- Kingdom: Animalia
- Phylum: Arthropoda
- Clade: Pancrustacea
- Class: Insecta
- Order: Lepidoptera
- Superfamily: Noctuoidea
- Family: Erebidae
- Genus: Selenisa
- Species: S. affulgens

Binomial name
- Selenisa affulgens (Saalmüller, 1881)

Synonyms
- Selenis affulgens Saalmüller, 1881

Species of moth

Selenisa affulgens is a species of moth in the family Erebidae. The species is known from Madagascar. It has a wingspan of 29 mm. The palpae are twice as long as its short head. Legs are short and scaled. The upperside is greyish brown-black except the thorax and triangular shaped stripe of the same width on the forewings. The underside is brownish ash grey.
