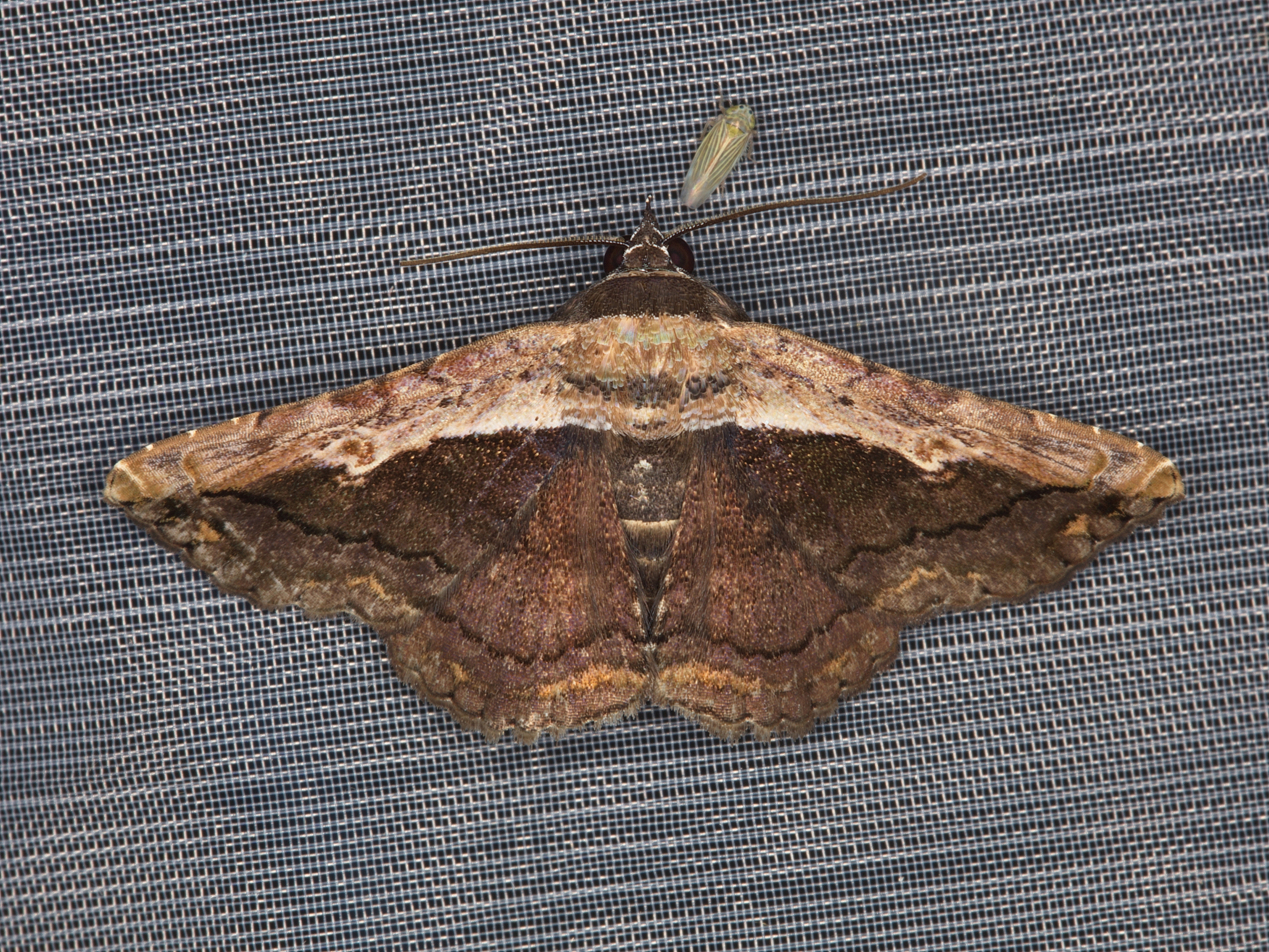

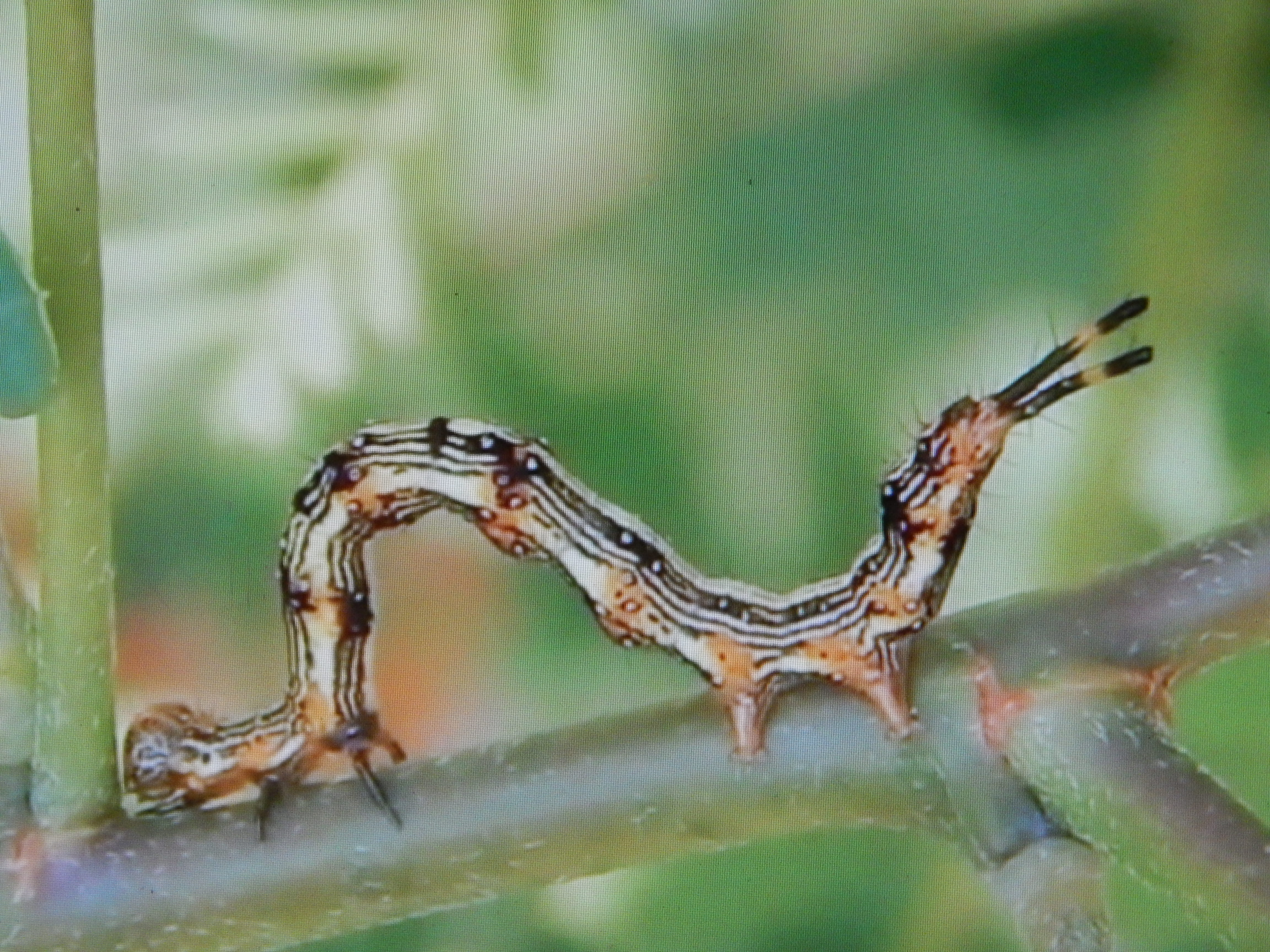
- Adult (top) and larva (bottom)

Scientific classification
- Kingdom: Animalia
- Phylum: Arthropoda
- Class: Insecta
- Order: Lepidoptera
- Superfamily: Noctuoidea
- Family: Erebidae
- Genus: Selenisa
- Species: S. sueroides

Binomial name
- Selenisa sueroides (Guenee, 1852)

= Selenisa sueroides =

Species of moth

Selenisa sueroides, the pale-edged selenisa or legume caterpillar, is an owlet moth in the family Erebidae. The species was first described by Achille Guenée in 1852. It is found in North America.

Some systems of Microtubing to help irrigate commercial crops have been compromised, as the larvae of S. sueroides had damaged the pipes in the citrus groves of south Florida. The caterpillars had munched holes in the plastic tubing to penetrate the pipes and then pupate. They seemed to prefer black tubing compared to coloured tubing.
