= Plastic mulch =

Plastic film used in the role of mulch

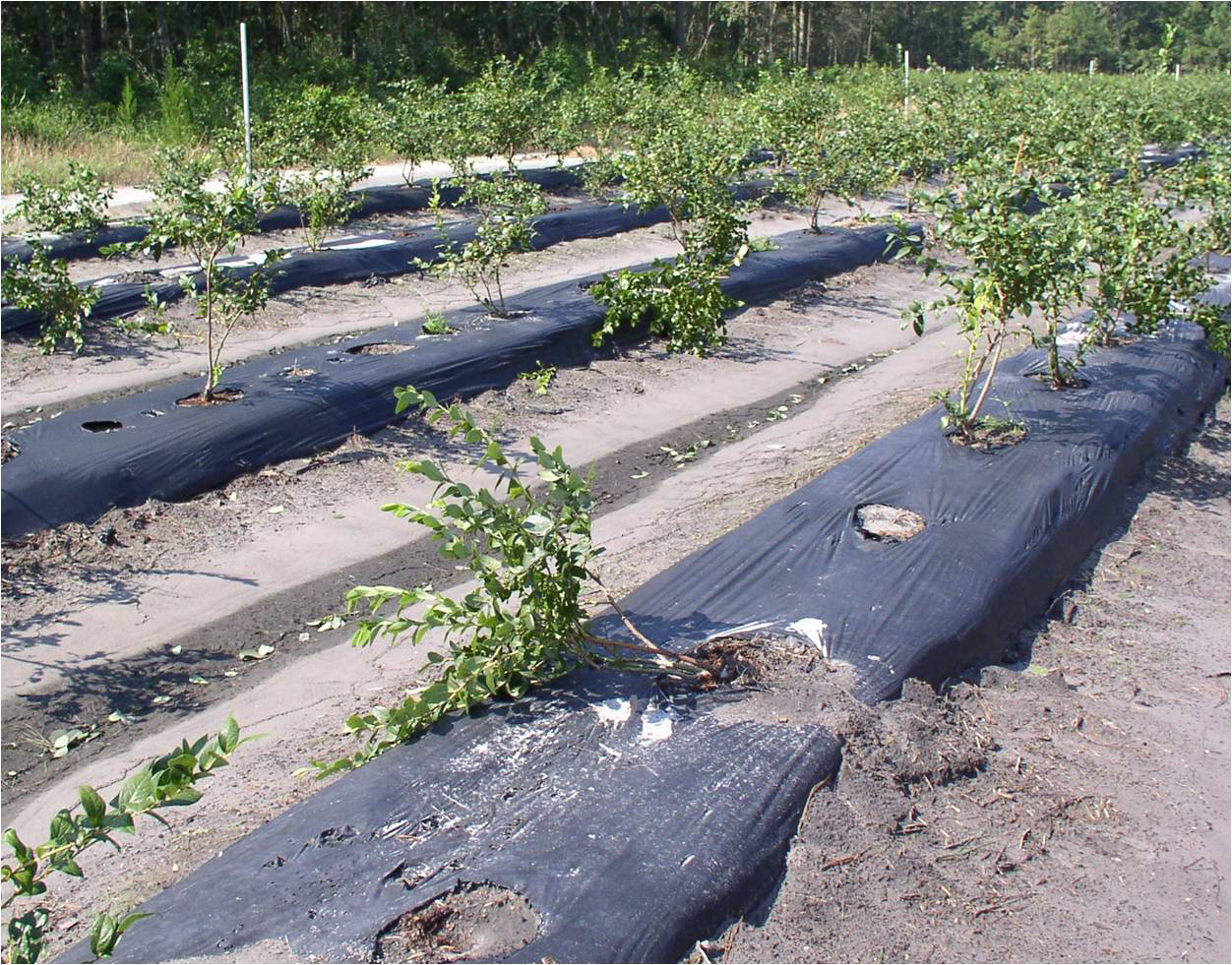
Blueberry plants growing through plastic mulch

Plastic mulch is a product used in plasticulture in a similar fashion to mulch, to suppress weeds and conserve water in crop production and landscaping. Certain plastic mulches also act as a barrier to keep methyl bromide, both a powerful fumigant and ozone depleter, in the soil. Crops grow through slits or holes in thin plastic sheeting. Plastic mulch is often used in conjunction with drip irrigation. Some research has been done using different colors of mulch to affect crop growth. Use of plastic mulch is predominant in large-scale vegetable growing, with millions of acres cultivated under plastic mulch worldwide each year.

Disposal of plastic mulch is an environmental problem. Technologies exist to provide for the recycling of used/disposed plastic mulch into viable plastic resins for re-use in the plastics manufacturing industry. However these methods are not very effective due to contamination by agrochemicals of the plastic. Other concerns include residual microplastics in the soil which can have negative effects on soil ecologies, including microbes and earthworms.

== History ==
The idea of using polyethylene film as mulch in plant production saw its beginnings in the mid-1950s. Dr. Emery M. Emmert of the University of Kentucky was one of the first to recognize the benefits of using LDPE (low-density polyethylene) and HDPE (high-density polyethylene) film as mulch in vegetable production. Emmert also wrote on other topics such as the use of plastic for greenhouses instead of glass and plastic in field high tunnels. Approximately 2,500 square miles (6,500 km^{2}) of agricultural land utilizes polyethylene mulch and similar row covers for crop production in the world. Laying plastic polythene (mulch) down over mounds formed in the soil was also pioneered in New Zealand in the mid fifties by strawberry growers in the Auckland area. By 1960-61 all strawberries grown commercially in New Zealand were grown through black polythene usually laid by hand. The plastic promoted growth, conserved moisture, brought on early fruiting, and restricted weed infestation. The earliest polythene laying machines were in use in New Zealand by the mid 1960s and were very similar to the machines sold today. The very first machines were designed by growers and built by small engineering/fabrication workshops, usually under the careful guidance and supervision of the farmer. Each machine for many years was generally similar to the last, with the occasional modification to improve performance.

== Benefits ==
The use of plastic mulches along with the use of drip irrigation has many benefits such as:

=== Soil temperature ===
The use of plastic mulch alters soil temperature. Dark mulches and clear mulches applied to the soil intercept sunlight and warm the soil, allowing earlier planting as well as encouraging faster growth early in the growing season. White mulch reflects heat from the sun, effectively reducing soil temperature. This reduction in temperature may help establish plants in mid-summer when cooler soil might be required.

=== Soil moisture retention ===
Plastic mulches reduce the amount of water lost from the soil due to evaporation. This means less water will be needed for irrigation. Plastic mulches also aid in evenly distributing moisture to the soil, which reduces plant stress.

=== Weed management ===
Plastic mulches prevent sunlight from reaching the soil which can inhibit most annual and perennial weeds. Clear plastics prevent weed growth. Holes in the mulch for plants tend to be the only pathway for weeds to grow.

=== Reduction in the leaching of fertilizer ===
The use of drip irrigation in conjunction with plastic mulch allows one to reduce leaching of fertilizers. Using drip irrigation eliminates the use of flood and furrow irrigation that applies large quantities of water to the soil, which in turn tends to leach nitrogen and other nutrients to depths below the root zone. Drip irrigation applies lower amounts of water with fertilizers injected and thus these fertilizers are applied to the root zone as needed. This also reduces the amount of fertilizer needed for adequate plant growth when compared to broadcast fertilization.

=== Improved crop quality ===
Plastic mulches keep ripening fruits off of the soil. This reduced contact with the soil decreases fruit rot as well as keeps the fruit and vegetables clean. This is beneficial for the production of strawberries, for example.

=== Reduction in soil compaction ===
The plastic mulch covering the soil decreases the crusting effect of rain and sunlight. The reduction in weed quantity means a decreased need for mechanical cultivation. Weed control between beds of plastic can be done using directly applied herbicides and through mechanical means. The soil underneath the plastic mulch stays loose and well aerated, with the mulch protecting the soil it covers from erosion.

=== Reduction in root damage ===
The use of plastic mulch creates a practically weed-free area around the plant, removing the need for cultivation except between the rows of plastic. Root damage associated with cultivation is therefore eliminated. Due to these factors, the use of plastic mulch can lead to an improvement in the overall growth of the plant.

== Disadvantages ==
There are many disadvantages to using plastic mulches in crop production as well.

=== Cost ===
The benefits from using plastic mulch come at a higher cost than planting in bare soil. These costs include equipment, the plastic film used as the mulch, transplanters designed for plastic beds, and additional labor during installation and removal of mulch films. Specialized mulch application equipment must be used to install plastic mulch beds into a field. These machines shape the soil and apply the plastic to the prepared soil. Transplanters designed for plastic mulch can be used to plant the desired crop. Hand transplanting is an option, but this is rather inefficient. The removal of plastic mulch also contributes to a higher cost through additional labor and equipment needed. Specialized designed undercutting equipment can be used to remove the plastic from the field after harvest.

=== Environmental concerns ===
If conventional plastics (e.g. PE) are used as mulch films, they are likely to accumulate in soil, since the removal and the correct disposal of these plastics are technically and economically burdensome. This accumulation could cause both crop yield reduction and environmental problems. Biodegradable polymers are polymers that can be degraded by the naturally occurring microbial community in an environmental system. They provide a more sustainable alternative to conventionally used plastics for mulch films. Providing the same benefits as detailed above, the problem of plastic accumulation in soils could be solved. Aliphatic polyesters and aliphatic-aromatic co-polyesters have shown to be promising groups of biodegradable polymers.

== Application ==
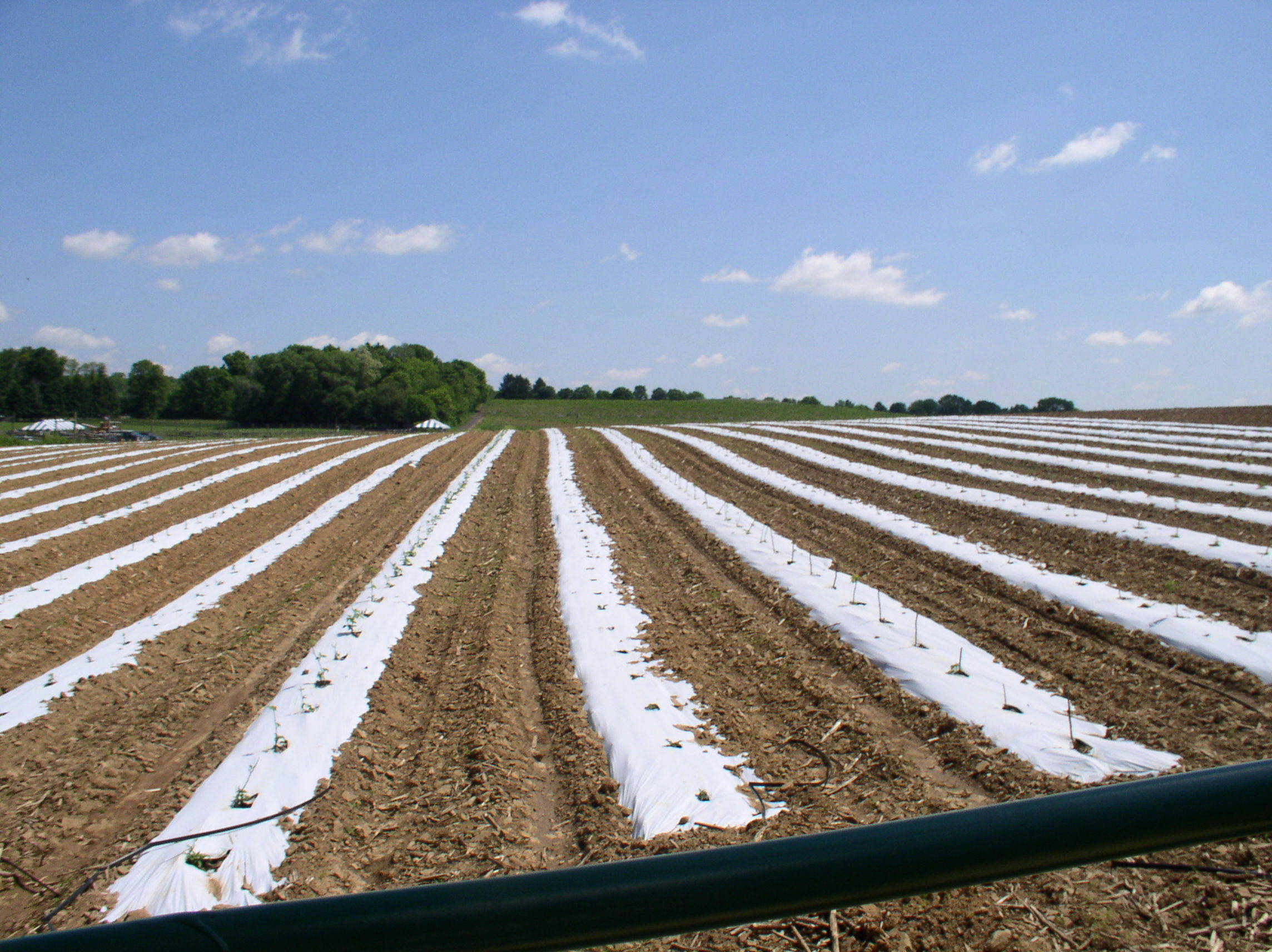
Raised vegetable beds covered in plastic mulch.

The use of plastic mulch requires a unique application process to ensure proper placement of the plastic film. This application process begins with preparing the field the same way one would for a flat seed bed. The bed must be free of large soil clods and organic residue. A machine called a plastic layer or a bed shaper is pulled over the field creating a row of plastic mulch covering a planting bed. These beds can be a flat bed which simply means the surface of the plastic mulch is level with the inter-row soil surface. Machines that form raised beds create a plastic surface higher than the inter-row soil surface. The basic concept of the plastic bed shaper is a shaping box which creates the bed, that is then covered by plastic via a roller and two coulters that cover the edges of the plastic film to hold the plastic the soil's surface. These plastic layers also place the drip irrigation line under the plastic while the machine lays the plastic. It is somewhat important that the plastic is rather tight. This becomes important in the planting process.

== Planting ==
Planting also requires specialized planting equipment. The most common planting equipment is a waterwheel type transplanter. The waterwheel transplanter utilizes a rotating drum or drums with spikes at set intervals. The drum or drums have a water supply that continuously fills the drum with water. The transplanter rolls the spiked drum over the bed of plastic. As the drum presses a spike into the plastic, a hole is punched and water flows into the punched hole. A rider on the transplanter can then place a plant in the hole. These drums can have multiple rows and varied intervals to create the desired spacing for that particular crop.

== See also ==
- Plasticulture – Use of plastic materials in agriculture
- Rubber mulch – Mulch made from recycled rubber
- Living mulch – Cover crop grown with a main crop as mulch
